This is a list of radio stations that broadcast in Australia.

The first digit of the callsign represents the state or territory: 1 – ACT, 2 – NSW and ACT, 3 – VIC, 4 – QLD, 5 – SA, 6 – WA, 7 – TAS, 8 – NT.

Australian Capital Territory (ACT)

Canberra
AM

FM

DAB+

New South Wales

Sydney Area

AM

FM

Northeast 
AM

FM

Albury
FM
87.6 MHz – Raw FM – Dance Radio - Narrowcast
88.0 MHz – Faith FM – Religious station - Narrowcast
89.5 MHz - SBS Radio 1 - Multicultural Radio
98.5 MHz - The Light - Christian Community
99.3 MHz – Sky Sports Radio – Relay of Racing Radio - Narrowcast
100.9 MHz - ABC News Radio - Continuous news plus parliamentary broadcasts
101.7 MHz – 2APH – Vision Australia Radio (Radio For The Print Handicapped)
103.3 MHz - Triple J - ABC National Youth Network
104.1 MHz - ABC Classic - Classical Music
104.9 MHz – Hit104.9 The Border – Southern Cross Austereo
105.7 MHz – Triple M The Border 105.7 – Southern Cross Austereo
106.5 MHz - ABC Goulburn Murray - ABC Local Radio
107.3 MHz – 2REM 107.3FM – Albury-Wodonga Community Radio

AM
990 kHz - ABC Radio National
1494 kHz – 2AY – Ace Radio Network
1611 kHz - Vision Christian Radio
1701 kHz - SBS Radio 2 - Multicultural Radio
Note: Albury-Wodonga are twin cities, with Albury in New South Wales and Wodonga in Victoria. Therefore, listings of radio stations in either category can be received in both areas.

Alectown
FM
 87.6 MHz Vision Christian Radio – Narrowcast

Armidale
FM
 87.8 MHz Vision Christian Radio – Narrowcast
 92.1 MHz 2ARM – Community radio
 100.3 MHz FM 100.3 – Broadcast Operations Group
 101.1 MHz Triple J – ABC
 101.9 MHz ABC New England North West – ABC
 103.5 MHz ABC Classic - ABC
 104.3 MHz Sky Sports Radio Sky Channel – Relay of racing radio
 106.9 MHz TUNE! FM – University of New England

AM
 720 kHz Radio National – ABC
 1134 kHz 2AD – Broadcast Operations Group

Ballina
 87.6 MHz Three Angels Broadcasting Network – Narrowcast
 88.0 MHz Sky Sports Radio – Racing Narrowcast
 101.9 MHz Paradise FM (2PAR) – Community radio

Banora Point
 87.8 MHz Vision Christian Radio – Narrowcast

Baradine
89.7 MHz Fly Mega 89.7 - Narrowcast 
 88.8 MHz Vision Christian Radio – Narrowcast
 93.0 MHz St. Louis Island - Narrowcast 
97.2 MHz Radio SBS Australia - Narrowcast 
97.5 MHz ABC News - Narrowcast 
99.0 MHz Popular Australia - Narrowcast 
100.0 MHz Music Gallery 100 - Narrowcast

Batemans Bay
 87.8 MHz Vision Christian Radio – Narrowcast
 100.5 MHz ABC News – ABC
 101.9 MHz ABC Classic – ABC
 103.5 MHz ABC South East – ABC
 104.3 MHz Power FM – East Coast Radio
 105.1 MHz Radio National – ABC
 105.9 MHz 2EC – East Coast Radio

Batlow
 87.6 MHz Vision Christian Radio – Narrowcast

Bathurst
FM
 88.9 MHz SBS Radio - Special Broadcasting Service – Multicultural
 92.3 MHz 2MCE – Charles Sturt University – Community radio
 95.1 MHz 2BS (formerly 2BS GOLD on 1503 AM) – Bathurst Broadcasters Pty Ltd
 95.9 MHz Triple J – ABC
 96.7 MHz Radio National – ABC
 97.5 MHz ABC Classic -ABC
 98.3 MHz ABC News – ABC
 99.3 MHz 2BXS - B-Rock FM – Bathurst Broadcasters Pty Ltd
 100.1 MHz Life FM 100.1 – Bathurst Christian Broadcasters
 100.9 MHz Sky Sports Radio - Tabcorp – Horse racing narrowcast

AM
 88.1 MHz Burraga Relay
 89.3 MHz Blayney Relay
 90.1 MHz Sofala Relay
 1629 kHz Goanna Radio (Country music)

Bega
FM
 93.7 MHz Edge FM – Community radio
 99.3 MHz ABC Classic – ABC
 100.1 MHz Triple J – ABC
 100.9 MHz Radio National – ABC
 102.5 MHz Power FM – East Coast Radio

AM
 765 kHz 2EC – East Coast Radio
 810 kHz ABC South East NSW – ABC

Berridale
 88.0 MHz Vision Christian Radio – Narrowcast

Bombala
 87.6 MHz GT-FM – Music Station - Narrowcast
 88.0 MHz Vision Christian Radio – Narrowcast
 90.9 MHz Sky Sports Radio – Racing Radio - Narrowcast
 91.7 MHz Snow FM – Relay of 97.7FM Cooma
 92.5 MHz 2XLFM – Relay of 96.1fm Cooma
 94.1 MHz ABC South East – ABC Local Radio
 103.7 MHz Monaro FM – Community radio

Note: Most Services listed in the Bega, Eden & Cooma sections can also be heard in Bombala

Bonalbo
 91.3 MHz ABC North Coast – ABC Local Radio
 92.1 MHz Radio National – ABC

Bourke
FM
 88.0 MHz Radio Info – Tourist Radio
 94.5 MHz Vision Christian Radio – Narrowcast
 96.1 MHz Sky Sports Radio – Repeater of 1017 kHz Sydney - Tabcorp
 98.5 MHz SBS Radio – SBS
 100.1 MHz Triple J - ABC
 101.1 MHz Radio National - ABC
 104.9 MHz Rebel FM – Rebel Media
 106.5 MHz 2CUZ – Indigenous community radio

AM
 585 kHz Outback Radio 2WEB – Community radio
 657 kHz ABC Western Plains - ABC

Bowral
FM
 88.0 MHz Oldies narrowcast
 92.5 MHz Youth Radio - Community radio
 102.9 MHz 2ST – Relay of 999 – Australian Radio Network
 107.1 MHz Highland FM – Community radio

AM
 1215 kHz KIX Country – Australian Radio Network - Narrowcast Country music

Brewarrina
 87.6 MHz Vision Christian Radio – Narrowcast

Broken Hill
FM
 87.6 MHz Hype FM – Dance Music Radio Station - Narrowcast
 94.9 MHz Cross FM – Narrowcast
 100.5 MHz Sky Sports Radio – Racing/Sport - Narrowcast
 102.1 MHz Triple J – ABC National Youth Network
 102.9 MHz Radio National – ABC
 103.7 MHz ABC Classic – ABC
 104.5 MHz ABC News – ABC
 106.9 MHz Hill FM – Broadcast Operations Group
 107.7 MHz 2DRY– Community radio

AM
 567 kHz 2BH
 999 kHz ABC Broken Hill – ABC Local Radio
 1656 kHz Radio 1656 AM

Byron Bay
 87.6 MHz Sky Sports Radio – Racing Narrowcast
 88.0 MHz Three Angels Broadcasting Network – Narrowcast
 99.9 MHz Bay FM (2BAY) – Community radio

Casino
 87.6 MHz Sky Sports Radio – Racing Narrowcast
 88.0 MHz Vision Christian Radio – Narrowcast
 107.9 MHz 2COW – Community radio

Cobar
FM
 87.8 MHz Vision Christian Radio – Narrowcast
 101.3 MHz Triple J – ABC
 102.9 MHz Cobarfm 102,9 – Community radio www.facebook.com/Cobarfm102.9
 103.7 MHz Zoo FM – Broadcast Operations Group – Relay of 92.7 Dubbo
 104.5 MHz Sky Sports Radio – Racing Radio Narrowcast
 105.3 MHz SBS Radio 1 – SBS
 106.1 MHz ABC Western Plains – ABC Local Radio
 106.9 MHz ABC Classic – ABC
 107.7 MHz Radio National – ABC

AM
 972 kHz 2DU – Broadcast Operations Group – Relay of 1251 Dubbo

Coffs Harbour
FM
 87.6 MHz Fine Music FM – Oldies narrowcast
 88.0 MHz Raw FM – Dance Music narrowcast
 91.5 MHz Triple J – ABC
 92.3 MHz ABC Coffs Coast – ABC Local Radio
 100.5 MHz 2HC – Broadcast Operations Group
 105.5 MHz Hit105.5 Coffs Coast – Southern Cross Austereo
 106.3 MHz Triple M Coffs Coast - Southern Cross Austereo
 107.1 MHz Sky Sports Radio – Racing Radio - Narrowcast
 107.9 MHz 2AIR – Community radio

AM
 639 kHz 2HC – Broadcast Operations Group

Condobolin
 87.6 MHz Vision Christian Radio – Narrowcast

Cooma
FM
 88.0 MHz Vision Christian Radio – Narrowcast
 90.5 MHz Monaro FM – Community radio
 95.3 MHz Radio National - ABC
 96.1 MHz 2XL - Capital Radio Network
 96.9 MHz Sky Sports Radio – Racing Radio - Narrowcast
 97.7 MHz Snow FM - Capital Radio Network
 106.5 MHz SBS Radio 1 - SBS National Radio

AM
 1602 kHz ABC South East – ABC

Note: ABC Services listed in the Bega/Eden area section can also be heard in Cooma

Coonamble
FM
91.9 MHz 2MTM FM – Community radio

Cootamundra
 87.6 MHz Sky Sports Radio – Racing Radio-Narrowcast
 88.0 MHz Vision Christian Radio – Narrowcast
102.9 MHz SBS Radio 1 – SBS
107.7 MHz Roccy FM – Broadcast Operations Group – Relay of 93.9 From Young

Coraki
 88.0 MHz Three Angels Broadcasting Network – Narrowcast

Corowa
 88.0 MHz Vision Christian Radio – Narrowcast

Cowra
 87.8 MHz Vision Christian Radio – Narrowcast
 95.9 MHz SBS Radio 1
 99.5 MHz Roccy FM

Deniliquin
FM
 87.6 MHz Vision Christian Radio – Narrowcast
 88.0 MHz Sky Sports Radio – Racing narrowcast
 99.3 MHz Radio National – ABC
 100.9 MHz ABC News
 102.5 MHz FM102.5 – North East Broadcasters
 106.1 MHz Country Radio – Country music narrowcast - North East Broadcasters
 107.3 MHz SBS Radio 1 – SBS

AM
 1521 kHz 2QN – North East Broadcasters

Dubbo
FM
 87.6 MHz Country Mix – Country music
 88.0 MHz Tourist Information Radio - tourist information and information about the area
 88.9 MHz DCFM 88.9 - Dubbo Community Broadcasters - variety of music and talk
 90.3 MHz Sky Sports Radio – Racing Radio
 91.1 MHz Zoo FM – Broadcast Operations Group – Dubbo CBD Translator
 92.7 MHz Zoo FM – Broadcast Operations Group
 93.5 MHz Triple M Dubbo – Southern Cross Austereo
 94.3 MHz Rhema FM – Community Christian
 95.9 MHz ABC Western Plains – ABC
 100.5 MHz SBS Radio – SBS

AM
 1251 kHz 2DU – Broadcast Operations Group

Eden
FM
 87.6 MHz KIX Country – Australian Radio Network - Narrowcast country music
 88.0 MHz Vision Christian Radio – Narrowcast
 104.7 MHz Eden FM – Community radio
 105.5 MHz 2EC – Relay of 765 kHz Bega - Australian Radio Network
 107.1 MHz Sky Sports Radio – Racing Radio
 107.9 MHz Radio National – ABC

AM
 1620 kHz Rete Italia – Italian Radio

Note: ABC Services listed in the Bega/Eden area section can also be heard in Cooma

Evans Head
 87.6 MHz Vision Christian Radio – Narrowcast
 88.0 MHz Sky Sports Radio – Racing Narrowcast
 88.9 MHz 88.9 FM (2RBR) – Community radio

Forbes
 87.6 MHz Vision Christian Radio – Narrowcast

Forster & Tuncurry
 93.5 MHz Sky Sports Radio – Racing Radio
 101.5 MHz 2GLA – Great Lakes FM
 100.3 MHz 2RE - Local Relay

Glen Innes
 88.0 MHz Vision Christian Radio – Narrowcast
106.7 2GEM FM (Translator of 93.5 Inverell)

Gloucester
 97.7 MHz The Breeze – Rebel Media
 99.3 MHz Sky Sports Radio – Racing Radio - Narrowcast
 100.1 MHz 2RE – Broadcast Operations Group – Relay from 1557
 100.9 MHz ABC Mid North Coast - ABC Local Radio
 102.5 MHz Radio National – ABC
 103.3 MHz Max FM – Broadcast Operations Group – Relay from 107.3

Goonellabah
 87.6 MHz Sky Sports Radio – Racing Radio - Narrowcast
 88.0 MHz Three Angels Broadcasting Network – Narrowcast

Gosford
FM

 88.0 MHz Raw FM - Narrowcast dance music
 92.5 MHz ABC Central Coast - ABC
 93.3 MHz Radio Five-O-Plus - Oldies community radio
 94.1 MHz todayscountry94one - Country music community radio
 94.9 MHz Rhema Central Coast - Christian community
 96.3 MHz CoastFM963 - Community radio
 97.3 MHz Radio Yesteryear - Oldies community radio
 98.1 MHz ABC NewsRadio - ABC
 101.3 MHz Hit101.3 Central Coast - Southern Cross Austereo
 104.5 MHz Star 104.5 FM - Nova Entertainment
 107.7 MHz Triple M Central Coast - Southern Cross Austereo

AM
 801 kHz SEN Track - Sports Entertainment Network

Goulburn
FM
 87.6 MHz Raw FM
 88.7 MHz Triple J – ABC
 89.5 MHz ABC Classic – ABC
 90.3 MHz ABC Local Radio – ABC
 93.5 MHz Eagle FM – (Capital Radio Network)
 94.3 MHz Sky Sports Radio Racing Radio
 99.9 MHz ABC NewsRadio – ABC
 100.7 MHz KIX Country – (Capital Radio Network)
 103.3 MHz 2GCR
 107.7 MHz GNFM - Capital Radio Network

AM
 1098 kHz ABC Radio National – ABC

Grafton
FM
 87.6 MHz – Narrowcast
 87.8 MHz (West Grafton) – Narrowcast
 88.0 MHz – Narrowcast
 91.5 MHz Triple J – ABC
 92.3 MHz ABC Mid North Coast – ABC
 97.9 MHz ABC Classic – ABC
 99.5 MHz Radio National – ABC
 101.5 MHz Sky Sports Radio – Racing Radio
 103.1 MHz 2CVC Loving Life FM – Community Christian
 103.9 MHz 2GF/T (Maclean) – Broadcast Operations Group
 104.7 MHz 2CLR – Broadcast Operations Group

AM
 738 kHz ABC North Coast – ABC
 1206 kHz 2GF – Broadcast Operations Group
 1611 kHz Radio 16 NTC
 1629 kHz Rete Italia – Italian-language

Griffith
FM
 87.6 MHz Sky Sports Radio – Racing Radio
 87.8 MHz Vision Christian Radio – Narrowcast
 92.7 MHz SBS Radio – SBS
 95.1 MHz 2MIA – Community radio
 96.5 MHz Triple J – ABC
 97.3 MHz ABC Classic – ABC
 98.1 MHz ABC News – ABC
 98.9 MHz ABC Radio National
 99.7 MHz hit99.7 Riverina MIA – Southern Cross Austereo
 100.5 MHz ABC Riverina – ABC

AM
 963 kHz Triple M Riverina MIA – Southern Cross Austereo
 1611 kHz Rete Italia – Italian Radio

Gulgong
FM
 87.6 MHz Magic 87.6 - Classic Hits - Narrowcast
 88.0 MHz Sky Sports Radio – Racing Radio - Narrowcast

Gunnedah
FM
 87.8 MHz Vision Christian Radio – Narrowcast
 97.5 MHz 2GGG – Broadcast Operations Group

AM
 1080 kHz 2MO – Broadcast Operations Group

Henty
 87.6 MHz Vision Christian Radio – Narrowcast

Holbrook
 87.6 MHz Vision Christian Radio – Narrowcast
 96.7 MHz 2GHR Greater Hume Radio – Community radio

Inverell
FM
 87.6 MHz Vision Christian Radio – Narrowcast
 95.1 MHz Gem FM - Commercial
 91.9 MHz STA FM Community Radio

AM
 1188 kHz 2NZ – Commercial

Ivanhoe
 87.6 MHz Vision Christian Radio – Narrowcast

Jindabyne
 93.9 MHz Monaro FM – Community radio
 94.7 MHz Snow FM – Relay of 97.7 MHz Cooma - Capital Radio Network
 95.5 MHz ABC South East – ABC Local Radio
 96.3 MHz 2XL – Relay of 918 kHz Cooma - Capital Radio Network
 97.1 MHz Radio National -ABC
 102.7 MHz Sky Sports Radio – Racing Radio - Narrowcast
 104.3 MHz SBS Radio 1 – SBS

Kandos
FM
 87.6 MHz Classic Gold FM - 50s & 60s Music
 88.0 MHz Sky Sports Radio – Racing Radio - Narrowcast
 97.9 MHz [Real FM]

Kangaroo Valley
 88.0 MHz Vision Christian Radio – Narrowcast

Katoomba
 87.6 MHz Vintage FM
 89.1 MHz BLU FM (2BLU) – Community radio
 96.1 MHz CADA – Australian Radio Network
 99.5 MHz Move FM – Midwest Radio Network
 101.1 MHz 2LT – Midwest Radio Network

Kempsey
FM
 87.6 MHz Vision Christian Radio – Narrowcast
 103.1 MHz TANK FM (2WET) – Community radio

AM
 684 kHz ABC Mid North Coast – ABC

Kyogle
 87.6 MHz Adventist Radio Australia – Narrowcast
 88.0 MHz Sky Sports Radio – Racing Narrowcast
 104.3 MHz 2LM/T – Commercial

Lightning Ridge
 87.6 MHz Three Angels Broadcasting Network
 89.7 MHz Opal FM – Community radio
 90.5 MHz 2WEB "Outback Radio" – Community radio
 91.3 MHz Now FM – Broadcast Operations Group – Relay of 98.3
 92.1 MHz ABC Western Plains – ABC
 92.9 MHz 2VM – Broadcast Operations Group – Relay of 1530
 93.7 MHz Radio National – ABC
 94.5 MHz SBS Radio – SBS
 96.1 MHz 2CUZ – Community radio
 98.5 MHz Sky Sports Radio – Racing Radio

Lismore
FM
 87.6 MHz (South Lismore) Vision Christian Radio – Narrowcast
 87.8 MHz Three Angels Broadcasting Network – Narrowcast
 92.9 MHz River FM (2NCR) – Community radio
 94.5 MHz ABC North Coast – ABC
 95.3 MHz ABC Classic – ABC
 96.1 MHz Triple J – ABC
 96.9 MHz ABC Radio National – ABC
 98.5 MHz News Radio – ABC
 98.9 MHz SBS Radio – SBS
 100.9 MHz Triple Z FM (2ZZZ) - Commercial

AM
 900 kHz 2LM - Commercial

Lithgow
FM
 89.7 MHz Sky Sports Radio – Racing Radio
 90.5 MHz EZY FM – Community radio
 92.1 MHz ABC Radio National
101.1 MHz 2LT Blue Mountains - Midwest Radio Network
 107.9 MHz Move FM – Midwest Radio Network
 99.5 MHz Move FM Blue Mountains - Midwest Radio Network

AM
 900 kHz 2LT – Midwest Radio Network
 1395 kHz ABC Local Radio – ABC

Menindee
 87.6 MHz Vision Christian Radio – Narrowcast

Moree
FM
 87.8 MHz Vision Christian Radio – Narrowcast
 98.3 MHz Now FM – Broadcast Operations Group
 102.1 MHz SBS Radio – SBS
 103.7 MHz Sky Sports Radio – Racing Radio

AM
 1530 kHz 2VM – Broadcast Operations Group

Mount Victoria
 87.8 MHz Vision Christian Radio – Narrowcast

Mudgee
FM
 87.6 MHz Classic Gold FM - 50s & 60s Music
 87.8 MHz Vision Christian Radio – Narrowcast
 90.9 MHz Sky Sports Radio – Racing Radio
 93.1 MHz Real FM - Broadcast Operations Group
 99.5 MHz ABC Western Plains – ABC

AM
 1449 kHz 2MG - Broadcast Operations Group

Mullumbimby
 87.6 MHz Sky Sports Radio – Racing Narrowcast
 88.0 MHz Three Angels Broadcasting Network – Narrowcast
 103.5 MHz Radio 97 AM (2MW translator) – Commercial

Murwillumbah
 972 kHz Radio 97 AM (2MW) – Broadcast Operations Group
 87.6 MHz Vision Christian Radio – Narrowcast

Muswellbrook
AM
 981 kHz 2NM 981 AM – Australian Radio Network
 1044 kHz ABC Upper Hunter – ABC
 1512 kHz Radio National – ABC (Newcastle station)
 103.5 MHz Merriwa relay
 104.1 MHz Murrurundi relay

FM
 94.5 MHz KIX Country – Australian Radio Network Narrowcast Country music
 98.1 MHz Power FM 98.1 FM – Australian Radio Network
 102.7 MHz Merriwa relay
 101.7 MHz Mount Helen FM (defunct)
 103.3 MHz Sky Sports Radio – Sky Channel
 104.9 MHz ABC Newsradio
 105.7 MHz ABC Upper Hunter – ABC
 96.9 MHz Murrurundi relay
 101.9 MHz Armidale relay
 107.7 MHz Also on 100.1 Murrurundi

Nambucca Heads
 87.6 MHz Vision Christian Radio – Narrowcast
 105.9 MHz 2NVR – Nambucca Valley community radio

Narrabri
AM
 1611 kHz Gold 1611 Wee Waa - Narrowcast

FM
 87.6 MHz Vision Christian Radio – Narrowcast
 91.3 MHz 2MAX FM – Community radio

Narrandera
 91.1 MHz Spirit FM – Community radio

Nevertire
 87.6 MHz Vision Christian Radio – Narrowcast

Newcastle 
FM

 87.8 MHz Newy 87.8 FM
 88.0 MHz Raw FM
 96.5 MHz 2CHR Cessnock (Community)
 99.7 MHz Rhema FM (Christian Community)
 100.5 MHz 2RPH – Radio Print Handicapped Network - Radio reading service
 102.1 MHz Triple J – ABC (National)
 102.9 MHz Triple M Newcastle – Southern Cross Austereo - Adult variety
 103.7 MHz 2NUR FM – University of Newcastle - Talk/Features/Special Interest (Community)
 105.3 MHz New FM – Broadcast Operations Group - Hot Adult Contemporary
 106.1 MHz ABC Classic – ABC (National)
 106.9 MHz hit106.9 Newcastle – Southern Cross Austereo - Top 40

AM
 1143 kHz 2HD – Broadcast Operations Group - News/Talk/Classic Hits
 1233 kHz 1233 ABC Newcastle – ABC
 1341 kHz Sky Sports Radio - Racing Radio
 1413 kHz SBS Radio - Multilingual talk and music
 1458 kHz NewsRadio – ABC
 1512 kHz Radio National – ABC
 1629 kHz Radio 1629 – 2HRN Radio 1629 Newcastle (Timeless Memories, Country, Easy Listening)

Nimbin
 87.6 MHz Vision Christian Radio – Narrowcast
 102.3 MHz 2NIM – Community radio

Nimmitabel
 88.0 MHz Vision Christian Radio – Narrowcast

Orange
FM
 88.0 MHz HIT Country 88 – Ad-Vance Media Works
 94.7 MHz 2MCE – Community radio
 101.9 MHz Triple J – ABC
 103.5 MHz Rhema FM – Christian Community
 105.1 MHz Triple M Central West – Southern Cross Austereo
 105.9 MHz hit105.9 Central West – Southern Cross Austereo
 106.7 MHz Sky Sports Radio – Racing Radio
 107.5 MHz FM107.5 – Community radio

AM
 549 kHz ABC Central West
 1089 kHz Radio 2EL

Digital
 Slice Radio www.sliceradio.com.au adult contemporary

Parkes
FM
 91.5 MHz Sky Sports Radio – Racing Radio
 95.5 MHz ROK FM – Broadcast Operations Group
 97.9 MHz 2LVR|Valley FM – Lachlan Valley community radio

AM
 1404 kHz 2PK – Broadcast Operations Group

Peak Hill
 87.6 MHz Vision Christian Radio – Narrowcast
 89.5 MHz Peak Hill FM – Community radio

Perisher
 98.7 MHz 2XL – Capital Radio Network
 101.9 MHz Snow FM – Capital Radio Network

Port Macquarie
FM
 87.6 MHz Raw FM – Dance Music
 87.8 MHz [Adventist Radio Australia – Narrowcast]
 92.7 MHz Sky Sports Radio – Racing Radio
 93.5 MHz Super Radio Mid North Coast FM93.5 Radio 531AM
 95.5 MHz ABC Mid North Coast – ABC
 96.3 MHz Triple J – ABC
 97.1 MHz Radio National – ABC
 98.7 MHz ABC Classic – ABC
 99.9 MHz Rhema FM – Christian Community
 100.7 MHz Triple M Mid North Coast - Southern Cross Austereo
 102.3 MHz hit Mid North Coast - Southern Cross Austereo
 103.9 MHz 2WAY-FM – Community radio

AM
 531 kHz Super Radio Mid North Coast FM93.5 Radio 531 AM
 756 kHz ABC Mid North Coast – ABC

Port Stephens
FM
 87.6 MHz Riot FM – Narrowcast
 88.0 MHz Bay FM 99.3 - Narrowcast
 95.1 MHz News Radio – ABC
 95.9 MHz 1233 ABC Newcastle – ABC
 97.5 MHz 2HD/T – Broadcast Operations Group
 98.3 MHz ABC Radio National – ABC
 100.9 MHz Port Stephens FM (2PSR) – Community radio

Quirindi
FM
 96.3 MHz Liverpool Plains 96.3 FM – Community radio

Tamworth
FM
 87.6 & 87.8 MHz Heartland FM – Country music
 88.9 MHz Tamworth's 88.9 FM – Community radio
 89.7 MHz Rhema FM – Christian Community
 90.5 MHz Sky Sports Radio – Racing Radio
 92.9 MHz 92.9fm Tamworth – Super Radio Network
 93.9 MHz Radio National – ABC
 94.7 MHz Triple J – ABC
103.1 MHz ABC Classic FM – ABC

AM
 648 kHz ABC New England – ABC
 1287 kHz 2TM – Broadcast Operations Group
 1629 kHz Rete Italia – Italian Radio

Taree & Wingham

FM
 87.6 MHz Three Angels Broadcasting Network
 96.3 MHz 2JJJ – Triple J
 103.3 MHz 2TLP – Community radio – Ngarralinyi Radio
 104.7 MHz 2BOB – Community radio
 105.7 MHz Sky Sports Radio – Racing radio
 106.5 MHz Rhema FM Manning Great Lakes – Christian radio
 107.3 MHz Max FM – Broadcast Operations Group

AM
 756 kHz ABC Mid North Coast – ABC
 1557 kHz 2RE – Broadcast Operations Group

Tenterfield
 87.8 MHz Vision Christian Radio – Narrowcast
 89.7 MHz TEN-FM (2TEN) – Community radio

Tumut
 96.3 MHz Sounds of the Mountains - Community radio

Wagga Wagga
FM
 89.5 MHz 1RPH – Radio for Print H/C
 93.1 MHz hit93.1 Riverina – Southern Cross Austereo
 103.1 MHz Gundagai Relay
 95.5 MHz Sky Sports Radio – Relay Of Racing Radio
 101.1 MHz Triple J – ABC
 90.7 MHz SW Slopes Relay
 101.9 MHz Life FM – Christian Community
 102.7 MHz ABC Riverina – ABC
 89.9 MHz SW Slopes Relay
 103.5 MHz SBS Radio – SBS
 103.1 MHz Coolamon Relay
 95.1 MHz Gundagai Relay
 98.7 MHz Junee Relay
 94.7 MHz Tumut Relay
 104.3 MHz ABC Radio National – ABC
 89.1 MHz SW Slopes Relay
 105.1 MHz News radio – ABC
 91.5 MHz SW Slopes Relay
 105.9 MHz ABC Classic – ABC
 88.3 MHz SW Slopes Relay
 107.1 MHz 2AAA – Community radio
 107.9 MHz South Wagga Relay
 97.9 MHz Junee Relay
 99.1 MHz Coolamon Relay

AM
 1152 kHz Triple M Riverina – (2WG) Southern Cross Austereo
 100.7 MHz Gundagai Relay
 107.9 MHz Tumut Relay
 1620 kHz Rete Italia

Walcha
FM
 88.5 MHz ABC New England – ABC
 89.3 MHz 2NEB – Broadcast Operations Group
 90.1 MHz Radio National – ABC

Note: Most Services listed in the Tamworth section can also be heard in Walcha

Walgett
 88.0 MHz [Adventist Radio Australia – Narrowcast]
 97.9 MHz Vision Christian Radio – Narrowcast
 105.1 MHz Now FM - Relay of 98.3 MHz Moree - Broadcast Operations Group
 106.7 MHz 2VM - Relay of 1530 kHz Moree - Broadcast Operations Group

Warren
 88.0 MHz Vision Christian Radio – Narrowcast

Wee Waa
AM
 1611 kHz – Wee Waa's Gold 1611 – Gold Music Talkback and Sport

FM
 87.6 MHz Vision Christian Radio – Narrowcast

Wellington
 91.5 MHz Binjang 91.5 – Binjang Community radio

West Wyalong
 87.8 MHz Vision Christian Radio – Narrowcast

White Cliffs
 88.0 MHz Vision Christian Radio – Narrowcast

Wilcannia
 88.0 MHz Vision Christian Radio – Narrowcast
 103.1 MHz Wilcannia River Radio – Wilcannia River Radio - Keeping It Alive

Wollongong/Nowra
FM
 87.6 MHz [Faith FM]
 90.9 MHz ABC NewsRadio – ABC
 93.3 MHz 2RPH – Radio for Print H/C – Future Service
 94.1 MHz 2LIV (NineFourOne) – Christian Community
 94.9 MHz Power FM Nowra – Australian Radio Network
 95.7 MHz ABC Classic – Classical Music
 96.5 MHz 96.5 Wave FM – Australian Radio Network
 97.3 MHz ABC Illawarra – ABC
 98.1 MHz i98FM – WIN Corporation
 98.9 MHz Triple J – ABC
 99.3 MHz 2MM – Relay of Sydney narrowcast Greek-language radio
 99.7 MHz Mac FM – Macedonian language narrowcast
 100.7 MHz Radio Hertz – Macedonian-language Radio
 101.1 MHz KIX Country – Australian Radio Network - Country Music Narrowcast Wollongong
 103.7 MHz Sky Sports Radio – Racing Radio
 104.5 MHz Triple U FM – Nowra community radio
 105.3 MHz KIX Country – Australian Radio Network - Country Music Narrowcast Wollongong
 106.9 MHz VOX FM – Community radio

AM
 603 kHz ABC Radio National – Also on 1431 kHz
 999 kHz 2ST Talk/Classic Hits (relays on 91.7 MHz/102.9 MHz/106.7 MHz)
 1035 kHz SBS Radio – SBS – Also on 1485 kHz
 1314 kHz Sky Sports Radio Racing Radio (National Racing Radio Network)
 1575 kHz SEN Track Sports Entertainment Network
 1611 kHz Oldies Off Air

Woodenbong
 87.6 MHz Vision Christian Radio – Narrowcast

Yass
100.3 MHz Yass FM – Community radio
107.9 MHz Sky Sports Radio – Racing radio

Young
FM
 87.6 MHz Sky Sports Radio – Racing Radio
 87.8 MHz Vision Christian Radio – Narrowcast
 92.3 MHz 2YYY – Community radio
 93.9 MHz Roccy FM – Broadcast Operations Group
 96.3 MHz ABC Riverina – ABC
 97.1 MHz Radio National – ABC
 98.7 MHz SBS Radio – SBS

AM
 1350 kHz 2LF – Broadcast Operations Group

Victoria

Melbourne
AM
 621 kHz ABC Radio National – ABC
 693 kHz 3AW – Nine Entertainment
 774 kHz ABC Radio Melbourne – ABC
 855 kHz 3CR – Community radio
 927 kHz RSN – Victorian racing industry
 1026 kHz ABC News Radio – ABC
 1116 kHz SEN 1116 – Sports Entertainment Network
 1179 kHz 3RPH – Radio Print Handicapped Network
 1224 kHz SBS Radio 1 – Special Broadcasting Service
 1278 kHz Magic 1278 – Nine Entertainment
 1377 kHz 3MP – Easy music – Ace Radio
 1422 kHz 3XY – Narrowcast Greek language Radio
 1503 kHz 3KND – South Eastern Indigenous Media Association – Narrowcast 
 1557 kHZ 2MM – Narrowcast Greek language Radio
 1593 kHz SEN Track - Sports Entertainment Network
 1611 kHz (Western Melbourne) Vision Christian Radio – Narrowcast
 1620 kHz 3CW 1620 - Narrowcast Chinese language music service - Bayswater
 1629 kHz 3CW 1629 - Narrowcast Chinese language music service - Williamstown
 1638 kHz 2ME – Narrowcast Arabic language Radio
 1656 kHz Rythmos Radio - Narrowcast Greek language Radio
 1665 kHz (Eastern Melbourne) Vision Christian Radio – Narrowcast
 1674 kHz Radio Haanji – Narrowcast Hindi language Radio
 1683 kHz Hellenic Radio - Narrowcast Greek language Radio
 1701 kHz Islamic Voice – Narrowcast Arabic language Radio

FM
87.6 MHz Kiss FM – Narrowcast club music radio – Melbourne CBD
87.6 MHz Hillside Radio - Narrowcast local radio - Bayswater
87.6 MHz Surf FM – Narrowcast local radio - Frankston & Cranbourne
87.6 MHz Arabic Language Radio Narrowcast - Reservoir
87.8 MHz Kiss FM – Narrowcast club music radio – Melbourne's west
87.9 MHz Kiss FM – Narrowcast club music radio – Frankston & Mornington Peninsula
88.0 MHz DCFM 88 Diamond Creek – Narrowcast Electronic dance music radio – Diamond Creek
88.0 MHz J-AIR - Jewish Radio
88.3 MHz Southern FM (Melbourne Australia) – Southern Suburbs community radio
88.6 MHz Plenty Valley FM – Community radio
88.9 MHz Wyn FM – Community radio - Wyndham region
89.9 MHz Light FM – Christian community
90.7 MHz SYN 90.7 – Youth community
91.5 MHz smoothfm 91.5 – Nova Entertainment
92.3 MHz 3ZZZ – multicultural community
93.1 MHz SBS Radio – Special Broadcasting Service
94.1 MHz 3WBC Whitehorse Boroondara region
94.9 MHz JOY 94.9 – LGBTQI+ community radio
95.7 MHz Golden Days Radio – Community radio
96.5 MHz 96.5 Inner FM – Heidelberg and Inner Northern Suburbs
97.1 MHz 3MDR Mountain Districts Radio – Dandenong Ranges
97.7 MHz Casey Radio Casey Radio – South Eastern Suburbs
97.9 MHz 979fm – Melton (community radio)
98.1 MHz Radio Eastern FM 98.1 – Outer Eastern Suburbs (community radio)
98.5 MHz Apple FM Bacchus Marsh
98.3 MHz 3RPP - Community radio - Frankston
98.7 MHz 3RPP – Community radio - Mornington
98.9 MHz North West FM – North Western Suburbs
99.1 MHz Yarra Valley FM - Community radio - Woori Yallock
99.3 MHz 3NRG - Community radio - Sunbury
100.3 MHz Nova 100 – Nova Entertainment
100.7 MHz Highlands FM - Community radio - Macedon Ranges
101.1 MHz KIIS 101.1 – Australian Radio Network
101.9 MHz Fox FM – Southern Cross Austereo
102.7 MHz 3RRR – Alternative Contemporary Music
103.5 MHz 3MBS – Music Broadcasting Society of Victoria – Classical Music
104.3 MHz Gold 104.3 – Australian Radio Network
105.1 MHz Triple M – Southern Cross Austereo
105.9 MHz ABC Classic – ABC
106.7 MHz PBS 106.7FM – Various music genres – Block Programming
107.5 MHz Triple J – ABC

DAB+
List of national programmes broadcast in Melbourne
List of Melbourne programmes

Alexandra
FM
 102.9 MHz ABC Goulburn Murray – ABC
 104.5 MHz Radio National – ABC
 106.9 MHz UG FM – Community radio

Apollo Bay
FM
 88.7 MHz 3OCR (OCR FM) – Community radio
 95.9 MHz Mixx FM - Repeater of 106.3 MHz in Colac)

Ararat
 88.0 MHz Faith FM Network
 92.9 MHz Vision Christian Radio – Narrowcast
 98.5 MHz Mixx FM - Part of the Ace Radio Network

Bairnsdale
FM
97.5 MHz Vision Christian Radio – Narrowcast
99.9 MHz TRFM - Ace Radio - Repeater of 99.5
105.5 MHz Radio East Gippsland – Community radio
106.3 MHz Radio National – ABC
107.9 MHz ABC NewsRadio – ABC

Ballarat
FM
 87.8 MHz Noise FM Three Angels Broadcasting Network
 88.0 MHz Ballarat Visitor Radio (Operated by 3BA/Power FM)
 94.3 MHz ABC NewsRadio
 95.9 MHz SBS Radio
 99.9 MHz Voice FM 99.9 – Community radio
102.3 MHz 3BA – Australian Radio Network
103.1 MHz Power FM 103.1 - Australian Radio Network
103.9 MHz Good News Radio – Christian radio
105.5 MHz ABC Classic – ABC
107.1 MHz Triple J – ABC
107.9 MHz ABC Ballarat – ABC

AM
1314 kHz Radio Sport National – (Racing and sports radio network re-broadcasting programs from Melbourne's Radio Sport National)

Bendigo
FM
 88.7 MHz 3BPH – Vision Australia Radio (Radio for the Print Handicapped)
 89.5 MHz ABC NewsRadio – ABC
 90.3 MHz Triple J – ABC
 91.1 MHz ABC Central Victoria – ABC
 91.9 MHz hit91.9 Bendigo – Southern Cross Austereo
 92.7 MHz ABC Classic – ABC
 93.5 MHz Triple M Bendigo – Southern Cross Austereo
 95.7 MHz SBS Radio - SBS
 96.5 MHz KLFM – Community radio
 98.3 MHz Gold Central Victoria – Relay of 1071 kHz
 101.5 MHz Bendigo's Fresh FM - Community radio
 105.1 MHz Life FM - Christian radio
 106.7 MHz Phoenix FM - Community radio
AM
 945 kHz RSN Racing & Sport – (relay of 927 Melbourne- Horse Racing and Sports programming)
 1071 kHz Gold Central Victoria - Australian Radio Network

Bright
FM
 87.6 MHz Valley FM – Narrowcast
 88.1 MHz ABC Classic FM – ABC
 88.9 MHz Radio National – ABC
 89.7 MHz ABC Goulburn Murray – ABC
 92.9 MHz Alpine Radio - Community radio

Casterton
 104.5 MHz Vision Christian Radio – Narrowcast

Castlemaine
FM
 88.0 MHz Radio 88 – Narrowcast Playing 60's Music
 106.3 MHz KLFM – Community radio
 94.9 MHz MAIN FM – Community radio
 87.6 MHz Vision Christian Radio – Narrowcast

Charlton
 87.6 MHz Vision Christian Radio – Narrowcast
 88.0 MHz - Charlton Visitor Radio

Chiltern
 88.0 MHz Vision Christian Radio – Narrowcast

Colac
FM
 87.6 MHz Vision Christian Radio – Narrowcast
 88.0 MHz Colac Visitor Information Radio
 88.4 MHz Faith FM – Narrowcast
 98.3 MHz 3OCR (OCR FM) – Community radio
 104.7 MHz ABC NewsRadio Colac and surrounds – ABC
 106.3 MHz Mixx FM – Ace Radio

AM
 1134 kHz 3CS – Ace Radio – Talk, Sport, Classic Hits

Coleraine
 88.0 MHz Vision Christian Radio – Narrowcast

Corryong/Khancoban
FM

 89.7 MHz ABC Riverina – ABC
 91.3 MHz Radio National – ABC
 94.9 MHz Revival Time Radio – Christian radio
 95.7 MHz Hit104.9 – Southern Cross Austereo – Relay of 104.9 from Albury
 96.5 MHz Triple M – Southern Cross Austereo – Relay of 105.7 from Albury
 98.1 MHz Radio National – ABC
 99.7 MHz ABC Goulburn Murray – ABC

Daylesford
FM
 87.6 MHz Orbit FM – Dance Culture radio – (Rebroadcast of Kiss FM Australia)

Echuca
FM
 87.6 MHz Vision Christian Radio – Narrowcast
 88.0 MHz Echuca Visitor Information Radio
104.7 MHz Radio EMFM – Community radio

the higher powered stations listed in the Deniliquin section can also be received in Echuca

Falls Creek
FM
 94.1 MHz Triple M The Border 105.7 – Southern Cross Austereo – Relay of 105.7 from Albury-Wodonga
100.5 MHz Hit104.9 The Border – Southern Cross Austereo – Relay of 104.9 from Albury-Wodonga

Geelong
FM
 87.6 MHz Visitor Information
 87.8 MHz Kiss FM - Narrowcast dance music
 88.0 MHz Visitor Information
 89.3 MHz KIX Country – Narrowcast country music - Grant Broadcasters
 93.9 MHz Bay FM - Grant Broadcasters
 94.7 MHz 94.7 The Pulse - Community radio
 95.5 MHz K-Rock - Grant Broadcasters
 96.3 MHz 96three - Christian Community
 99.5 MHz 3RPH – Vision Australia Radio (Radio for the Print Handicapped)

Note: Some Geelong stations are audible within parts of the Melbourne Metropolitan Area (especially in the southern bayside suburbs), and higher powered Melbourne-wide radio broadcasting stations can be heard in Geelong.

Hamilton
FM
 88.9 MHz Mixx FM – Part of the Ace Radio Network
 91.7 MHz ABC NewsRadio – ABC
 92.5 MHz Radio National – ABC
 93.3 MHz ABC Classic – ABC
 94.1 MHz ABC Western Victoria – ABC
 94.9 MHz Triple J – ABC
 102.1 MHz Vision Christian Radio – Narrowcast

AM
 981 kHz 3HA – Part of the Ace Radio Network

Harrietville
FM
 94.5 MHz; Alpine Radio - Community Radio
98.7 MHz; ABC Goulburn Murray - ABC Local Radio

Heathcote
FM
 87.6 MHz 87 FM (Danceradio)

Horsham
FM
 88.0 MHz Sport 927 – Relay Of Racing Radio
 96.5 MHz Triple H – Community radio
 99.7 MHz Radio National – ABC
 101.3 MHz Mixx FM – Part of the Ace Radio Network
 102.9 MHz Vision Christian Radio – Narrowcast

AM
 594 kHz ABC Western Victoria – ABC
 1089 kHz 3WM – Part of the Ace Radio Network

Kaniva
 88.0 MHz Vision Christian Radio – Narrowcast

Kilmore
FM

 98.3 MHz OKR FM – Community radio

Kyneton
 88.0 MHz Vision Christian Radio – Narrowcast
 100.7 MHz Highlands FM - Community radio

Latrobe Valley/Central Gippsland
FM
 87.6 MHz Radio Sport National – Traralgon, Sale (Racing & Sports Radio Network re-broadcasting programs from Melbourne's Radio Sport National)
 88.0 MHz Radio Sport National – Moe & Morwell (Racing & Sports Radio Network re-broadcasting programs from Melbourne's Radio Sport National)
 88.0 MHz Latrobe City Council Info Radio (Traralgon City only)
 91.9 MHz SEN Track – Racing radio
 92.7 MHz Radio Sport National – Yarram – (Racing & Sports Radio Network re-broadcasting programs from Melbourne's Radio Sport National)
 93.5 MHz 3RPH/T – Radio for the Print Handicapped (from Warragul)
 94.3 MHz Triple M Warragul – Southern Cross Austereo
 95.1 MHz ABC News – ABC
 96.7 MHz Triple J – ABC
 97.9 MHz Triple M – Southern Cross Austereo
 99.5 MHz 3TR FM – Part of the Ace Radio Network
 100.7 MHz ABC Gippsland – ABC
 101.5 MHz ABC Classic – ABC
 103.1 MHz West Gippsland Community Radio Inc.  3BBR-FM
 103.9 MHz Life FM – Christian radio
 104.7 MHz Gippsland FM – Community radio

AM
 531 kHz 3GG Warragul
 828 kHz ABC Gippsland – ABC
 1242 kHz Gold 1242 – Part of the Ace Radio Network

Leongatha
FM
 88.1 MHz - Local Radio 3mFM – Community radio
 91.3 MHz SEN Track – Racing Radio

Mallacoota
 87.6 MHz - [Adventist Radio Australia – Narrowcast]
 88.0 MHz - Vision Christian Radio – Narrowcast
 101.7 MHz - 3MGB - Community Radio
 103.3 MHz - ABC Radio National
 104.9 MHz - ABC Gippsland

Mansfield
FM
 99.7 MHz 3MCR – Community radio
 103.7 MHz ABC Goulburn Murray – ABC
 105.3 MHz Radio National – ABC

Maryborough
FM
 99.1 MHz Goldfields FM

Marysville
FM
 89.3 MHz - Flow FM
 98.5 MHz - UGFM - Community Radio

Mildura
FM
 87.6 MHz The Range- Country Music Narrowcast
 87.8 MHz Vision Christian Radio – Narrowcast
 88.0 MHz Son-FM88 – Narrowcast (Christian)
 89.1 MHz Rete Italia – Italian language narrowcast
 97.9 MHz Triple M Sunraysia – Southern Cross Austereo
 98.7 MHz SBS Radio – Multilingual
 99.5 MHz hit99.5 Sunraysia – Southern Cross Austereo
 100.3 MHz ABC NewsRadio – ABC
 101.1 MHz Triple J – ABC
 102.7 MHz ABC Classic – ABC
 104.3 MHz ABC Mildura Swan Hill – ABC
 105.9 MHz ABC Radio National – ABC
 106.7 MHz Hot FM – Community radio
 107.5 MHz 3MPH – Vision Australia Radio (Radio for the Print Handicapped)

AM
 1359 kHz Radio Sport National – (Racing & Sports Radio Network re-broadcasting programs from Melbourne's Radio Sport National)
 1467 kHz River 1467 – 3ML – Australian Radio Network
 1611 kHz 1611AM – Oldies

Mount Buller
FM
 91.3 MHz 3SR-FM – Southern Cross Austereo
 93.7 MHz Star FM – Southern Cross Austereo

Murrayville
FM
103.5 MHz 3MBR – Community radio

Nagambie
 88.0 MHz The Range - Narrowcast - Country Music

Nhill
 87.6 MHz Vision Christian Radio – Narrowcast

Omeo
FM
 90.1 MHz Triple M – Southern Cross Austereo – Relay of 105.7 from Albury
 90.9 MHz High Country Radio – Community radio – Omeo Town
 92.5 MHz Hit104.9 – Southern Cross Austereo – Relay of 104.9 from Albury
 97.3 MHz High Country Radio – Community radio – Omeo Region
 99.7 MHz Radio National – ABC

AM
 720 kHz ABC Gippsland – ABC

Orbost
FM
 95.5 MHz Radio Sport National - (Racing & Sports Radio Network re-broadcasting programs from Melbourne's Radio Sport National)
 97.1 MHz ABC Gippsland – ABC
 98.7 MHz Radio National – ABC

Ouyen
FM
 92.9 MHz 3MBR – Community radio – Relay of 103.5 from Murrayville

Port Campbell
 88.0 MHz Vision Christian Radio – Narrowcast

Portland
FM
 92.9 MHz 3HA - (Relay)
 93.7 MHz Mixx FM – Ace Radio Network
 96.9 MHz ABC Western Victoria – ABC
 98.5 MHz Radio National – ABC
 99.3 MHz 3RPC – Community radio
105.3 MHz Vision Christian Radio – Narrowcast

AM
 1611 kHz Rete Italia – Italian narrowcast

Rosedale
FM
 87.6 MHz Three Angels Broadcasting Network

Sale
FM
 87.6 MHz Radio Sport National – (Racing & Sports Radio Network re-broadcasting programs from Melbourne's Radio Sport National)
 88.0 MHz Faith FM – Narrowcast
 90.3 MHz Vision Christian Radio – Narrowcast
 91.9 MHz Kids FM – Kids radio station
 90.7 MHz 3REG – Community radio – Lakes Entrance
 99.5 MHz TR-FM – Part of the Ace Radio Network – Central Gippsland
 99.9 MHz TR-FM – Part of the Ace Radio Network – East Gippsland
 100.7 MHz ABC Gippsland – ABC
 103.9 MHz Life FM - Christian Community
 105.5 MHz 3REG – Community radio – Bairnsdale only
 106.3 MHz Radio National – ABC – Bairnsdale only

AM
 828 kHz ABC Gippsland – ABC
 1242 kHz Gold 1242 – Part of the Ace Radio Network

Seymour
FM
 87.6 MHz Hit Radio 87.6
 99.3 MHz Music Narrowcast
 103.9 MHz Seymour-FM Community radio

Shepparton
FM
 87.6 MHz Raw FM – Dance Music
 88.0 MHz The Range - Country Music
 94.5 MHz Triple J – ABC
 95.3 MHz Triple M Goulburn Valley – Southern Cross Austereo
 96.1 MHz ABC Classic – ABC
 96.9 MHz hit96.9 Goulburn Valley – Southern Cross Austereo
 97.7 MHz ABC Goulburn Murray - ABC
 98.5 MHz ONE FM 98.5 – Community radio
 100.1 MHz 3SPH – Vision Australia Radio (Radio for Print Handicapped)
 107.7 MHz ABC News - ABC

AM
 1260 kHz RSN Racing & Sport – Relay of 927 kHz Melbourne
 1413 kHz Vision Christian Radio – Narrowcast
 1629 kHz Niche Radio Network – Narrowcast World Talk

St Arnaud
 106.1 MHz Vision Christian Radio – Narrowcast

Stawell
 87.6 MHz [Faith FM] - Christian radio
 93.7 MHz Vision Christian Radio – Narrowcast

Swan Hill
FM
 99.1 MHz Smart FM – Community radio
 102.1 MHz ABC Mildura Swan Hill – ABC
 103.7 MHz ABC Classic – ABC
 105.3 MHz Triple J – ABC
 106.9 MHz Sport 927 – Relay of Racing Radio
 107.7 MHz Mixx FM – Part of the Ace Radio Network

AM
 1332 MHz 3SH – Part of the Ace Radio Network

Swifts Creek
FM
 91.7 MHz High Country Radio – Community radio – Relay of 97.3 Omeo
103.5 MHz Radio National – ABC

Terang
 90.5 MHz Vision Christian Radio – Narrowcast

Wangaratta
FM
 87.6 MHz Orbit FM – Relay of Kiss FM - Dance Radio - Narrowcast
 88.0 MHz & 87.8 MHz Vision Christian Radio – Narrowcast
 99.3 MHz RSN - Radio Sport National - Racing Radio - Narrowcast
 101.3 MHz Oak FM - Community radio
 102.1 MHz Edge FM - North East Broadcasters

AM
 756 kHz Radio National – ABC
 1566 kHz 1566 3NE - North East Broadcasters

Warracknabeal
 100.5 MHz Vision Christian Radio – Narrowcast

Warrnambool
FM
 87.6 MHz Orbit FM – Relay of Kiss FM (Port Fairy area)
 89.7 MHz Triple J – ABC
 91.3 MHz ABC News – ABC
 92.1 MHz ABC Classic – ABC
 94.5 MHz 3YB FM - Ace Radio Network
 95.3 MHz Coast FM 95.3 – Ace Radio Network
 100.9 MHz Vision Christian Radio – Narrowcast
 101.7 MHz Radio National – ABC
 103.7 MHz 3WAY FM – Community radio

AM
 882 kHz 3RPH – Radio For The Print Handicapped
 1602 kHz ABC Western Victoria – ABC

Wedderburn
FM
87.6 MHz Wedderburn Visitor Radio

Wodonga
 88.4 MHz Wodonga Community Radio - TAFE radio - Narrowcast
 89.5 MHz SBS Radio 1 – SBS - Narrowcast
 98.5 MHz The Light – Community Christian
 100.9 MHz ABC News Radio - ABC
 103.3 MHz Triple J – ABC
 104.1 MHz ABC Classic – ABC
 106.5 MHz ABC Goulburn Murray – ABC

AM
 990 kHz ABC Radio National – ABC

Note: Albury-Wodonga are twin cities, with Wodonga in Victoria and Albury in New South Wales. Therefore, listings of radio stations in either category can be received in both areas.

Woori Yallock
 87.6 MHz Vision Christian Radio – Narrowcast
 96.1 MHz ABC Melbourne – Relay of ABC Melbourne on 774 kHz
 99.1 MHz 3VYV Yarra Valley FM

Yarrawonga
 87.6 MHz Vision Christian Radio – Narrowcast

Yea
 88.9 MHz UG FM – Community radio – Relay of 106.9 from Alexandra
 93.7 MHz Hit93.7 – Relay of 96.9 from Shepparton – Southern Cross Austereo

Queensland

Brisbane 
AM
612 kHz 612 ABC Brisbane (4QR) – ABC (Talk/News/Information)
693 kHz 4KQ – 693 SENQ Sports Entertainment Network
792 kHz 4RN – Radio National – ABC (Information Variety)
882 kHz 4BC – Nine Entertainment (Talk/News/Information)
936 kHz ABC News – ABC (News)
1008 kHz Radio TAB (Betting/Racing)
1053 kHz SEN Track – Sports Entertainment Network Narrowcast
1116 kHz 4BH – Ace Radio Network (Easy Listening)
1197 kHz Switch 1197 (Youth community radio)
1296 kHz 4RPH (Radio for Print Handicapped)
1647 kHz Arabic Radio – relay of 2ME Radio Arabic from Sydney
1656 kHz VAC Radio (Chinese language)
1701 kHz Radio Brisvaani (Hindi language narrowcast)

FM
87.6 MHz/87.8 MHz/88.0 MHz (various suburbs) Vision Christian Radio – Narrowcast
87.8 MHz [Deception Bay] Faith FM Narrowcast (Christian)
88.0 MHz (Brisbane CBD) Planet Radio (Environmental narrowcast)
90.5 MHz Rebel FM (Logan) – Rebel Media
92.1 MHz The Breeze (Logan) – Rebel Media
93.3 MHz SBS Radio (International languages)
94.9 MHz River 94.9 – Australian Radio Network (Music Variety)
96.5 MHz 96five Family FM (Christian community)
97.3 MHz KIIS 97.3 – Australian Radio Network/Nova Entertainment (Music and Lifestyle)
98.1 MHz 4EB (Ethnic community radio)
98.9 MHz 98.9 FM (4AAA) (Indigenous community radio/Country music)
99.7 MHz 99.7 BridgeFM (4RED) (Redcliffe community radio; variety)
100.3 MHz Bay FM (4BAY) (Bayside community radio; variety)
101.1 MHz 101.1 FM (4CBL) (Logan community Radio; variety)
101.5 MHz 4OUR FM (Caboolture community radio; variety)
102.1 MHz 4ZZZ (Youth community radio)
103.7 MHz 4MBS (Classical music community radio)
104.5 MHz Triple M – Southern Cross Austereo (Rock/NRL)
105.3 MHz B105 FM – Southern Cross Austereo (New Hits)
106.1 MHz ABC Classic – ABC (Classical Music)
106.9 MHz Nova 106.9 – Nova Entertainment (New Hits/Dance/Youth)
107.7 MHz Triple J – ABC (Alternative)

DAB+ (metropolitan and regional)
Double J
ABC Country
ABC Extra
ABC Jazz
ABC Grandstand
SBS Chill
SBS PopAsia
The Edge Digital – Australian Radio Network
MBS Light – light classical
Mix '80s – Australian Radio Network
Mix '90s – Australian Radio Network
Chemist Warehouse Remix – Australian Radio Network
Koffee – Nova Entertainment
smoothfm – Nova Entertainment
Triple M Classic Rock Digital – Southern Cross Austereo
Koffee – Nova Entertainment
OldSkool Radio - Southern Cross Austereo
Australian Indian Radio-Online Hindi Radio

Allora
 87.6 MHz Vision Christian Radio – Narrowcast
 88.0 MHz [Three Angels Broadcasting Network] – Christian radio

Aloomba
 88.0 MHz Vision Christian Radio – Narrowcast

Atherton
 88.0 MHz Vision Christian Radio – Narrowcast
 99.1 MHz SEN Track - Sports Entertainment Network

Augathella
FM
88.0 MHz Radio TAB – Relay from 1008 Brisbane
106.1 MHz 4VL – Smart Radio Group – Relay of 918 Charleville
107.7 MHz Radio National – ABC

Ayr
FM
96.1 MHz SBS Radio – SBS
97.1 MHz Sweet FM – Narrowcaster

Babinda
FM
87.6 MHz Vision Christian Radio – Narrowcast
94.1 MHz ABC Far North – ABC
94.9 MHz Kool FM – Coastal Broadcasters
95.7 MHz Radio National – ABC
102.5 MHz 4KZ – Coastal Broadcasters

Barcaldine
 87.6 MHz Vision Christian Radio – Narrowcast

Beachmere
 87.6 MHz [Adventist Radio Australia – Narrowcast]
 88.0 MHz Vision Christian Radio – Narrowcast

Beaudesert
FM
87.6 MHz [Adventist Radio Australia – Narrowcast]
88.0 MHz Vision Christian Radio – Narrowcast
89.7 MHz Radio TAB – Relay of 1008 Brisbane
90.5 MHz Rebel FM – Rebel Media
92.1 MHz The Breeze – Rebel Media
101.5 MHz Beau FM – Community radio

Beechmont
 87.8 MHz Vision Christian Radio – Narrowcast

Beerwah
 88.0 MHz Vision Christian Radio – Narrowcast

Bell
 88.0 MHz Vision Christian Radio – Narrowcast

Biloela
 87.6 MHz- Radio TAB - TX Site: Commercial Hotel - Power: 1W
 88.0 MHz- KIX Country - Power : 1w
 88.9 MHz- Rebel FM - Owned by Rebel Media - TX Site: Banana Range - Power: 400w
 89.7 MHz- The Breeze - Owned by Rebel Media - TX Site: Banana Range - Power: 400w
 90.1 MHz Vision Christian Radio – Narrowcast
 94.9 MHz- ABC Capricornia - Owned by: ABC - TX Site: Telstra Tower Biloela - Power: 10w
 101.1 MHz- Rebroadcast of 95.1 MHz Triple M Central Queensland - Owned and Maintained by: Callide Mine under permission from Southern Cross Austereo - TX Site: Mt Murchision - Power: 320w E.I.R.P
 102.7 MHz- Rebroadcast of 666 kHz 4CC  - Owned and Maintained by: Callide Mine under permission from Australian Radio Network - TX Site: Mt Murchision - Power: 320w E.I.R.P

AM
 666 kHz 4CC – Owned by: Australian Radio Network - TX Site: 299 Burnett Hwy PROSPECT - Power: 2 kW

Blackall
FM
87.6 MHz Vision Christian Radio – Narrowcast
95.1 MHz West FM – Relay of 104.5 Longreach
98.3 MHz Radio TAB – Relay of 1008 Brisbane
100.7 MHz 4LG – Relay of 1098 Longreach
103.1 MHz SBS Radio – SBS
107.9 MHz Radio National – ABC

Blackwater
 87.6 MHz Vision Christian Radio – Narrowcast

Boonah
 87.6 MHz Vision Christian Radio – Narrowcast
 100.1 MHz Rim FM (Community radio)

Bowen
FM
93.5 MHz Vision Christian Radio – Narrowcast
92.7 MHz Radio National – ABC
98.3 MHz 4TO – Southern Cross Austereo – (relay from Townsville)
95.1 MHz Gem FM – Community radio
107.9 MHz hit103.1 Townsville – Southern Cross Austereo – (relay from Townsville)

AM
1611 kHz Rete Italia – Italian Radio

Bundaberg
FM
93.1 MHz 93.1 Bundaberg
93.9 MHz Hitz939 - Australian Radio Network
94.7 MHz Coral Coast FM (Community Radio)
95.5 MHz Radio TAB (Betting/Racing)
96.3 MHz Phoenix FM (Community Radio)
97.1 MHz KIX Country  (Narrowcast) Australian Radio Network
98.5 MHz ABC Classic – ABC (Classical Music)
99.3 MHz Triple J – ABC (Alternative)
100.1 MHz ABC Wide Bay – ABC (Talk/News/Music/Information)
100.9 MHz Radio National – ABC (Information Variety)
102.5 MHz The Breeze (Wide Bay) – Rebel Media
105.1 MHz Rhema FM (Christian Community Radio)
106.7 MHz Rebel FM (Wide Bay) – Rebel Media

AM
855 kHz ABC Wide Bay – ABC (Talk/News/Music/Information)
1332 kHz 4BU - Australian Radio Network

Cairns
FM
87.6 MHz Vision Christian Radio - Narrowcast
87.8 MHz Orbit FM - Dance music narrowcast, simulcast of Kiss FM Australia
88.0 MHz Orbit FM - Dance music narrowcast, simulcast of Kiss FM Australia
89.1 MHz Cairns FM - Community radio
90.5 MHz SBS Radio – SBS
98.7 MHz 4CIM - Indigenous community radio
99.5 MHz Triple M Cairns – Southern Cross Austereo
101.1 MHz ABC NewsRadio – ABC
101.9 MHz Coast FM - Youth community radio
102.7 MHz Star 102.7 – Australian Radio Network
103.5 MHz hit103.5 Cairns – Southern Cross Austereo
104.3 MHz Radio TAB - Horse racing narrowcast
105.1 MHz Radio National – ABC
105.9 MHz ABC Classic – ABC
106.7 MHz ABC Far North – ABC
107.5 MHz Triple J – ABC

AM
801 kHz ABC Far North – ABC
846 kHz 4CA – Australian Radio Network

Cairns Airport
FM
93.9 MHz Radio National – ABC
94.7 MHz ABC Classic – ABC
95.5 MHz ABC Far North – ABC Local Radio
96.3 MHz ABC News – ABC
97.1 MHz Triple J – ABC

Capella
 88.0 MHz Vision Christian Radio – Narrowcast

Chambers Flat
 87.6 MHz Vision Christian Radio – Narrowcast

Charleville
FM
 87.6 MHz Vision Christian Radio – Narrowcast
 88.0 MHz Radio Charlie – Narrowcast
101.7 MHz Triple C – Smart Radio Group
104.1 MHz Radio TAB (Betting/Racing)
107.3 MHz Radio National – ABC

AM
 603 kHz ABC Western Qld – ABC
 918 kHz 4VL – Smart Radio Group

Charters Towers
FM
88.0 MHz Vision Christian Radio – Narrowcast
93.5 MHz SBS Radio – SBS
94.3 MHz Radio TAB – Relay of 1008 Brisbane
95.9 MHz hit95.9 Charters Towers – Southern Cross Austereo
96.7 MHz Vision Christian Radio – Narrowcast
97.5 MHz Radio National – ABC

AM
828 kHz 4GC – Resonate Broadcasting

Chinchilla
 87.6 MHz Vision Christian Radio – Narrowcast
 88.0 MHz [Three Angels Broadcasting Network FM] – Christian radio
 95.5 MHz The Breeze – Rebel Media
 97.1 MHz Rebel FM – Rebel Media

Clermont
FM
87.6 MHz Vision Christian Radio – Narrowcast
102.1 MHz 4HI – Smart Radio Group
103.7 MHz SBS Radio – SBS
104.5 MHz ABC Classic FM – ABC
106.1 MHz Radio TAB – Relay of 1008 Brisbane
107.7 MHz Radio National – ABC

Cloncurry
FM
87.6 MHz Vision Christian Radio – Narrowcast
89.3 MHz Triple J – ABC
90.5 MHz ABC Classic – ABC
100.5 MHz ABC West Qld – ABC
103.7 MHz Radio TAB – Relay of 1008 Brisbane
105.3 MHz Triple J – ABC
106.1 MHz SBS Radio – SBS
107.7 MHz Radio National – ABC

AM
693 kHz 4LM – Smart Radio Group – Relay of 666 from Mount Isa

Collinsville
 87.6 MHz Vision Christian Radio – Narrowcast

Cooktown
101.7 MHz Rebel FM – Rebel Media
103.3 MHz Radio TAB (Betting/Racing)
105.7 MHz ABC Far North – ABC
107.3 MHz Radio National – ABC

Cowley
 88.0 MHz Vision Christian Radio – Narrowcast

Crows Nest
 87.6 Adventist Radio Australia – Narrowcast - Narrowcast

Cunnamulla
 102.9 MHz Vision Christian Radio – Narrowcast

AM

 1584 kHz 4VL (relay)

Currumbin
 88.0 MHz – Country Music Narrowcast
 104.1 MHz - Radio 97 AM (2MW translator) – Commercial

Dalby
FM
87.8 MHz Three Angels Broadcasting Network FM – Christian radio
88.0 MHz Vision Christian Radio – Narrowcast
89.9 MHz 4DDD – Community radio
94.3 MHz Radio TAB – Relay of 1008 Brisbane
95.9 MHz 4WK – Broadcast Operations Group – Relay of 963 from Toowoomba
97.5 MHz CFM – Southern Cross Austereo – Relay of 100.7 from Toowoomba

AM
1611 kHz Rete Italia – Italian Radio
1629 kHz Hot Country –  Smart Radio Group  Country Music

East Palmerston
 88.0 MHz Vision Christian Radio – Narrowcast

Darling Downs (Toowoomba/Warwick)
FM
87.6 MHz Toowoomba City FM/Warwick Christian Radio
88.0 MHz and 87.8 MHz Power FM  Toowoomba-Lockyer Valley-Highfields district (Training Radio Station)
91.5 MHz Country FM (Country Music Narrowcast)
92.9 MHz Voice FM (Christian community radio)
93.7 MHz Radio TAB (Betting/Racing)
96.7 MHz ABC NewsRadio – ABC (News)
99.1 MHz Kids FM (Kids Narrowcast)
100.7 MHz hit100.7 Darling Downs – Southern Cross Austereo
102.7 MHz 4DDB (Community radio)
103.3 MHz Triple J – ABC (Warwick repeater)
103.9 MHz 4TTT (Community radio)
104.1 MHz Triple J – ABC (Toowoomba repeater)
105.7 MHz Radio National – ABC (Information Variety)
107.3 MHz ABC Classic – ABC (Classical Music)

AM
747 kHz ABC Southern Queensland – ABC (Talk/News/Information)
864 kHz Triple M Darling Downs – Southern Cross Austereo
963 kHz 4WK - Broadcast Operations Group
1242 kHz 4AK - Broadcast Operations Group
1620 kHz The Breeze – Rebel Media

Brisbane FM stations are also audible in the Toowoomba area.

Emerald
87.6 MHz Adventist Radio Australia – Narrowcast
88.0 MHz KIX Country – Australian Radio Network
90.7 MHz ABC Classic FM – ABC (Classical Music)
92.3 MHz Vision Christian Radio – Narrowcast
93.9 MHz Radio National – ABC (Information Variety)
94.7 MHz Hit Central Queensland – Southern Cross Austereo
95.5 MHz Radio TAB (Betting/Racing)

AM
1143 kHz 4HI - Resonate Broadcasting
1548 kHz ABC Capricornia - ABC
1611 kHz Hot Country - Macquarie Regional Radio Network

Gayndah
 87.6 MHz Vision Christian Radio – Narrowcast
 91.5fm Burnett River Community radio

Gladstone
FM
87.6 MHz Adventist Radio Australia – Narrowcast
88.0 MHz KIX Country - Australian Radio Network
91.9 MHz 91.9 Fresh FM (Christian community radio)
93.5 MHz Hit Central Queensland – Southern Cross Austereo
94.3 MHz Radio TAB (Betting/Racing)
95.1 MHz Triple M Central Queensland - Southern Cross Austereo
95.9 MHz Radio National – ABC (Information Variety)
99.1 MHz ABC Capricornia - Australian Broadcasting Corporation (News/Talk/Information)

AM
927 kHz 4CC – Australian Radio Network

Glen Aplin
 87.6 MHz Vision Christian Radio – Narrowcast

Glenden
 88.0 MHz Vision Christian Radio – Narrowcast

Glenlee
 87.8 MHz Vision Christian Radio – Narrowcast

Gold Coast
FM
87.6 MHz Raw FM - Dance music narrowcast
87.8 MHz / 88.0 MHz Vision Christian Radio - Narrowcast
88.0 MHz Beach FM
88.5 MHz ABC Classic - Classical music – ABC
89.3 MHz 4CRB - Community radio
90.1 MHz Radio National – ABC
90.9 MHz 90.9 Sea FM – Contemporary hit radio - Southern Cross Austereo
91.7 MHz ABC Coast FM – ABC Local Radio - ABC
92.5 MHz Gold FM – Adult contemporary - Southern Cross Austereo
94.1 MHz Jazz Radio 94.1FM - Jazz music - Community radio
95.7 MHz NewsRadio – Rolling news - ABC
97.7 MHz Triple J – Alternative music - ABC
99.4 MHz Rebel FM – Active rock – Rebel Media
100.6 MHz The Breeze - Classic hits - Rebel Media
102.9 MHz Hot Tomato – Adult contemporary
105.7 MHz Radio Metro - Youth - Community radio
107.3 MHz Juice107.3 - Christian community radio

AM
1620 kHz SEN Track - Sports Entertainment Network
1692 kHz Station X - Adult contemporary 

DAB+
Rabbit Radio -  – (Independent Culture Portal)

Goondiwindi
 87.6 MHz Vision Christian Radio – Narrowcast
 96.3 MHz Rebel FM – Rebel Media
 98.7 MHz The Breeze – Rebel Media
 88.7 MHz Now FM – Broadcast Operations Group
 89.5 MHz 2VM – Broadcast Operations Group
 90.3 MHz Radio TAB – Relay of Racing Radio
 92.7 MHz ABC South Qld – ABC
 94.3 MHz Radio National – ABC

AM
 1611 kHz Hot Country Radio Queensland

Gordonvale
 87.6 MHz Vision Christian Radio – Narrowcast

Gracemere
 87.8 MHz Vision Christian Radio – Narrowcast

AM

 837 kHz ABC Capricornia

Greenmount East
 88.0 MHz Vision Christian Radio – Narrowcast

Gympie
 96.1 MHz Zinc 96.1 – Australian Radio Network
 91.5 MHz Cooloola Christian Radio (Christian Community Radio)

AM

 558 kHz 4GY

Highfields
 87.6 MHz - Highfields FM
 88.0 MHz - Vision Christian Radio – Narrowcast

Ingham
 96.9 MHz SEN Track Sports Entertainment Network
 99.1 MHz Vision Christian Radio – Narrowcast

Inglewood
 88.0 MHz Vision Christian Radio – Narrowcast

Injune
 101.9 MHz KIX Country - Australian Radio Network

Innisfail
 87.6 MHz Vision Christian Radio – Narrowcast

Ipswich
 87.6 MHz/ 88.0 MHz Vision Christian Radio – Narrowcast
 88.0 MHz KIX Country - Australian Radio Network
 94.9 MHz River 94.9 - serving the Ipswich/Lockyer Valley/Toowoomba area - Australian Radio Network

Jimboomba
 87.6 MHz/ 88.0 MHz Vision Christian Radio – Narrowcast

Julia Creek
 87.8 MHz Vision Christian Radio – Narrowcast

Kallangur
 88.0 MHz Vision Christian Radio – Narrowcast

Kilcoy
 87.6 MHz Vision Christian Radio – Narrowcast
 88.0 MHz Three Angels Broadcasting Network – Narrowcast

Killarney
 87.6 MHz Vision Christian Radio – Narrowcast

Hervey Bay/Maryborough
FM
 87.8 MHz BayCity Gold Radio (Booral & Turtle Cove)
 88.0 MHz BayCity Gold Radio (River Heads)
 87.8 MHz Three Angels Broadcasting Network – Narrowcast
 92.3 MHz KIX Country - Australian Radio Network
 97.7 MHz ABC News Radio – ABC
 98.5 MHz ABC Classic – ABC
 99.3 MHz Triple J – ABC
 100.1 MHz ABC Wide Bay – ABC
100.9 MHz Radio National – ABC
101.9 MHz hit101.9 Fraser Coast – Southern Cross Austereo
102.5 MHz The Breeze (Wide Bay) – Rebel Media
103.5 MHz Triple M Fraser Coast – Southern Cross Austereo
106.7 MHz Rebel FM (Wide Bay) – Rebel Media
107.5 MHz Fraser Coast FM - Frasercoast Community Radio

AM
855 kHz ABC Wide Bay – ABC
1161 kHz Radio TAB (Betting/Racing)

Kingaroy
FM
87.6 MHz Vision Christian Radio – Narrowcast
87.8 MHz Three Angels Broadcasting Network Australia [Narrowcast]
89.1 MHz hit89.1 South Burnett – Southern Cross Austereo
90.7 mHz CROW FM 90.7 (Local Music Station)
93.1 MHz Radio TAB (Betting/Racing)

AM
1071 kHz 4SB – 4SB 1071 – Resonate Broadcasting

Longreach
FM
 87.6 MHz Vision Christian Radio – Narrowcast
 99.1 MHz Radio National – ABC
102.1 MHz ABC Classic – ABC
103.7 MHz Radio TAB (Betting/Racing)
104.5 MHz West FM
106.1 MHz Triple J – ABC

AM
 540 kHz ABC Western Queensland – ABC
1098 kHz 4LG

Mackay
87.6 MHz Classic Gold 87.6 FM (Oldies Narrowcast)
87.8 MHz/88.0 MHz Vision Christian Radio – Narrowcast
93.9 MHz KIX Country – Australian Radio Network
97.9 MHz ABC Classic – ABC (Classical Music)
98.7 MHz Triple M Mackay & The Whitsundays – Southern Cross Austereo
99.5 MHz Triple J – ABC (Alternative)
100.3 MHz hit100.3 Mackay – Southern Cross Austereo
101.1 MHz ABC Tropical North – ABC (Talk/News/Information)
101.9 MHz Star 101.9 – Australian Radio Network
102.9 MHz Radio National – ABC (Information Variety)
103.5 MHz Radio TAB (Betting/Racing)
107.5 MHz 4CRM (Community radio)

AM

1026 kHz – 4MK - Australian Radio Network
1647 kHz Vision Christian Radio – Narrowcast

Maleny
 87.6 MHz Vision Christian Radio – Narrowcast

Mareeba
 87.6 MHz Adventist Radio Australia – Narrowcast
 88.0 MHz/92.3 MHzVision Christian Radio – Narrowcast
 97.9 MHz hit97.9 Tablelands - Southern Cross Austereo

Miles
 87.6 MHz Vision Christian Radio – Narrowcast
 94.5 MHz Rebel FM – Rebel Media
 101.3 MHz The Breeze – Rebel Media

Millmerran
 88.0 MHz Vision Christian Radio – Narrowcast
 88.0 MHz Three Angels Broadcasting Network Australia – Narrowcast

Mitchell
 88.0 MHz Vision Christian Radio – Narrowcast
 104.5 MHz 4ZR (Relay)

Monto
 87.6 MHz Vision Christian Radio – Narrowcast
 88.0 MHz Australian Visitor Radio
 100.5 MHz The Breeze – Rebel Media
 105.1 MHz Rebel FM – Rebel Media

Moranbah
 96.9 MHz - 4RFM Community radio
 87.6 MHz Vision Christian Radio – Narrowcast

Moresby
 87.6 MHz Vision Christian Radio – Narrowcast

Moura
 87.6 MHz Vision Christian Radio – Narrowcast
 88.0 MHz KIX Country - Australian Radio Network
 96.1 MHz ABC Capricornia
 96.9 MHz ABC Radio National

Mourilyan
 87.6 MHz Vision Christian Radio – Narrowcast

Mundubbera
 88.0 MHz Vision Christian Radio – Narrowcast

Murgon
 87.6 MHz Adventist Radio Australia – Narrowcast
 88.0 MHz Vision Christian Radio – Narrowcast

Mount Isa
FM
87.6 MHz Adventist Radio Australia – Narrowcast
88.0 MHz Vision Christian Radio – Narrowcast
100.9 MHz Mob FM – Community radio
101.7 MHz ABC Classic FM – ABC
102.5 MHz hit102.5 Mount Isa – Southern Cross Austereo
103.3 MHz Radio TAB – Relay from 1008 Brisbane
104.1 MHz Triple J – ABC
106.5 MHz ABC West Qld – ABC
107.3 MHz Radio National – ABC

AM
666 kHz Zinc666 – Smart Radio Group

Nanango
AM
 1692 kHz Vision Christian Radio – Narrowcast

FM
88.0 MHz Adventist Radio Australia – Narrowcast

Narangba
 87.8 MHz Vision Christian Radio – Narrowcast

Nebo
 88.0 MHz Vision Christian Radio – Narrowcast

Normanton
 87.6 MHz Vision Christian Radio – Narrowcast

Nundah
 87.8 MHz Vision Christian Radio – Narrowcast

Oakey
 87.6 MHz Vision Christian Radio – Narrowcast

Pittsworth
 88.0 MHz Vision Christian Radio – Narrowcast

Proston
 88.0 MHz Vision Christian Radio – Narrowcast

Quilpie
 87.6 MHz Vision Christian Radio – Narrowcast
 104.5 MHz 4VL (Relay)

Rainbow Beach
 87.6 MHz Vision Christian Radio – Narrowcast

Rockhampton
FM
87.6 MHz/88.0 MHz Vision Christian Radio – Narrowcast
92.7 MHz KIX Country (Country music) – Australian Radio Network
98.5 MHz 4YOU (Community radio)
99.9 MHz Radio TAB (Betting/Racing)
100.7 MHz 4US (Indigenous community radio)
101.5 MHz Triple M Central Queensland – Southern Cross Austereo
103.1 MHz Radio National – ABC (Information Variety)
104.7 MHz Triple J – ABC (Alternative)
105.5 MHz ABC News – ABC
106.3 MHz ABC Classic – ABC (Classical Music)
107.9 MHz Hit Central Queensland – Southern Cross Austereo

AM
837 kHz ABC Capricornia – ABC (Talk/News/Information)
990 kHz 4RO – Australian Radio Network
1584 kHz 4CC – Australian Radio Network

Roma
FM
87.6 MHz Vision Christian Radio – Narrowcast
94.3 MHz Radio TAB (Betting/Racing)
95.1 MHz hit95.1 Maranoa – Southern Cross Austereo
97.7 MHz ABC Classic – ABC (Classical Music)
103.3 MHz Triple J – ABC (Alternative)
105.7 MHz ABC Local Radio – ABC (Talk/News/Information)
107.3 MHz Radio National – ABC (Information Variety)

AM
1476 kHz 4ZR - Resonate Broadcasting
1611 kHz Hot Country 1611- Smart Radio Group
1638 kHz Station X - Adult Contemporary

Sarina
 88.0 MHz Vision Christian Radio – Narrowcast

South Johnstone
 88.0 MHz Vision Christian Radio – Narrowcast

Springsure
 87.6 MHz Vision Christian Radio – Narrowcast

St George
FM Radio
 87.6 MHz Vision180 Radio – Narrowcast (Christian, youth)
 102.1 MHz Vision Christian Radio – Narrowcast
 105.3 MHz 4ZR (relay)
AM Radio
 1611 kHz Hot Country 1611 – Smart Radio Group

Stanthorpe
 87.6 MHz Vision Christian Radio – Narrowcast
 88.0 MHz Adventist Radio Australia – Narrowcast
 90.1 MHz The Breeze – Rebel Media
 91.5 MHz 4WK – Repeater of 963 service from Toowoomba – Broadcast Operations Group
 93.1 MHz TAB Radio – Racing from Brisbane's 1008
 97.1 MHz Rebel FM – Rebel Media
 97.9 MHz hit100.7 Darling Downs – Repeater of 100.7 service from Toowoomba
 98.7 MHz TEN-FM – Community radio
 99.5 MHz 4AK – Repeater of 1242 service from Toowoomba – Broadcast Operations Group
100.3 MHz Triple M Darling Downs – Repeater of 864 service from Toowoomba

Sunshine Coast
FM
87.6 MHz Village FM - Narrowcast classic hits
87.6 MHz Yandina Adventist Radio Australia – Narrowcast
88.0 MHz Nambour Adventist Radio Australia – Narrowcast
88.0 MHz Caloundra Adventist Radio Australia – Narrowcast
88.7 MHz ABC Classic - Classical music - ABC
89.5 MHz Triple J - Alternative music - ABC
90.3 MHz 90.3 ABC Coast FM - ABC Local Radio - ABC
91.1 MHz Hot 91.1 - Contemporary hit radio - Australian Radio Network
91.9 MHz 91.9 Sea FM - Contemporary hit radio - Great Southern Land Media Group
92.7 MHz 92.7 Mix FM - Adult contemporary - Great Southern Land Media Group
94.5 MHz ABC News – Rolling news - ABC
101.3 MHz Noosa community radio
104.9 MHz Sunshine FM - Community radio
106.5 MHz 106five Rhema FM – Christian community radio

Townsville
FM
87.6 MHz Classic Gold 87.6 FM - Oldies Narrowcast
87.8 MHz Faith FM - Narrowcast
88.0 MHz Vision Christian Radio – Narrowcast
94.3 MHz ABC News – ABC (News)
98.9 MHz KIX Country – Australian Radio Network
99.9 MHz Live FM (Christian community)
100.7 MHz Power100 – Australian Radio Network
101.5 MHz ABC Classic – ABC (Classical Music)
102.3 MHz 4TO FM - Southern Cross Austereo
103.1 MHz hit103.1 Townsville – Southern Cross Austereo
103.9 MHz 4TTT (Community radio)
104.7 MHz Radio National – ABC (Information Variety)
105.5 MHz Triple J – ABC (Alternative)
106.3 MHz Star 106.3 – Australian Radio Network
107.1 MHz 4K1G (Indigenous community radio)

AM
630 kHz ABC Far North – ABC Local Radio (Talk/News/Information)
891 kHz Radio TAB (Betting/Racing)

Tully
 88.0 MHz Vision Christian Radio – Narrowcast
 92.7 MHz Vision Christian Radio – Narrowcast
 90.3 MHz 4ZKZ (Hot FM) – Commercial
AM
 693 kHz 4KZ – Commercial

Wallangarra
 87.6 MHz Vision Christian Radio – Narrowcast

Warwick
 87.6 MHz Three Angels Broadcasting Network Australia – Narrowcast
 87.8 MHz Vision Christian Radio – Narrowcast
 88.4 MHz [Adventist Radio Australia – Narrowcast]
 91.9 MHz Cfm

Whitsunday
 93.5 MHz Vision Christian Radio – Narrowcast

Winton
 87.6 MHz Vision Christian Radio – Narrowcast

Woodford
 87.6 MHz Three Angels Broadcasting Network Australia – Narrowcast
 88.0 MHz Vision Christian Radio – Narrowcast

Woongoolba
 87.8 MHz Vision Christian Radio – Narrowcast

Yeppoon
 88.0 MHz Vision Christian Radio – Narrowcast
 91.3 MHz Keppel FM - Community radio
 96.1 MHz KIX Country - Australian Radio Network

Yungaburra
 87.6 MHz Vision Christian Radio – Narrowcast

South Australia

Adelaide
AM
531 kHz Radio 531 Italian-Language Radio – 5RTI
729 kHz ABC Radio National – ABC
891 kHz ABC Radio Adelaide – ABC
972 kHz ABC NewsRadio – ABC
1197 kHz 5RPH Adelaide – Radio for the Print Handicapped
1323 kHz Cruise 1323 – Australian Radio Network
1395 kHz FIVEaa – Nova Entertainment
1539 kHz Radio TAB (Betting/Racing of Radio TAB)
1611 kHz Vision Christian Radio – Narrowcast
1629 kHz SEN 1116 - Sports Entertainment Network

FM
87.6 MHz Radio Italia Uno - Italian language radio
87.6 MHz (Aldinga Beach) Vision Christian Radio – Narrowcast
87.8 MHz (Willunga) Vision Christian Radio - Narrowcast
87.8 MHz (North-East Suburbs) Faith FM - Seventh Day Adventist
87.8 MHz (Southern Suburbs) Faith FM - Seventh Day Adventist
88.0 MHz Faith FM - Seventh Day Adventist
88.0 MHz (Aldinga Beach) Faith FM - Seventh Day Adventist
88.0 MHz (Gawler) Faith FM - Seventh Day Adventist
88.0 MHz (Christie Downs) Vision Christian Radio - Narrowcast
88.0 MHz (Mount Barker) Vision Christian Radio – Narrowcast
88.7 MHz Coast FM – Southern Suburbs
89.1 MHz Triple B FM – Barossa Valley
89.7 MHz PBA-FM – North Eastern Suburbs
91.9 MHz Nova 91.9 – Nova Entertainment
92.7 MHz Fresh 92.7 – Urban and Dance Radio for the Youth
93.7 MHz Three D Radio – Alternative
99.9 MHz 5MBS – (Music Broadcasting Society of SA)
100.3 MHz Power FM – Adelaide Hills (Eastern Adelaide)
100.5 MHz WOW FM – Western Suburbs
101.5 MHz Radio Adelaide – Radio Adelaide
102.3 MHz MIX 102.3 FM – Australian Radio Network
103.1 MHz 5EBI – Ethnic Broadcasters Inc
103.9 MHz ABC Classic – Classical music
104.7 MHz Triple M – Southern Cross Austereo
105.5 MHz Triple J – ABC (Also at 95.9)
106.3 MHz SBS Radio – Special broadcasts
107.1 MHz SAFM – Southern Cross Austereo
107.9 MHz 1079 Life

DAB+
Double J
ABC Country
ABC Jazz
ABC Grandstand
Triple J Unearthed
SBS Chill
SBS Arabic 24
SBS PopAsia
SBS PopDesi
SBS Radio 1
SBS Radio 2
SBS Radio 3, BBC World Service simulcast
Buddha Hits
Dance Hits
Easy 80s Hits
Oldskool 90s Hits
Urban Hits
CW Remix
EBI DigitalWorld
The Edge – Australian Radio Network
IRIS
1079 Life
Mix 102.3 80s – Australian Radio Network
Mix 102.3 90s – Australian Radio Network
Triple M Classic Rock Digital – Southern Cross Austereo
Triple M Hard Rock Digital - Southern Cross Austereo
Triple M Soft Rock Digital - Southern Cross Austereo
Triple M 90s Digital - Southern Cross Austereo
smoothfm – Nova Entertainment
smooth chill – Nova Entertainment
Soundcloud Radio

Adelaide Hills
 87.6 MHz (Birdwood) Vision Christian Radio - Narrowcast
 88.0 MHz (Birdwood) Faith FM - Seventh Day Adventist
 88.9 MHz Lofty 88.9 – Community radio
 90.3 MHz SAFM – Southern Cross Austereo – Relay of 107.1
 94.3 MHz 5MU – Australian Radio Network
 95.1 MHz SBS Radio – SBS – Relay of 106.3
 95.9 MHz Triple J – ABC – Relay of 105.5
 96.7 MHz Mix 102.3 – Australian Radio Network – Relay of 102.3
 97.5 MHz ABC Classic – ABC – Relay of 103.9
 98.3 MHz Triple M – Southern Cross Austereo – Relay of 104.7
 99.1 MHz Nova 91.9 – Nova Entertainment – Relay of 91.9
 99.9 MHz 5MBS – Classical music – Community radio
 100.3 MHz Power FM (Adelaide Hills) – Australian Radio Network

Bordertown
 100.3 MHz Flow FM
 106.1 MHz 5TCB – Community radio
 87.6 MHz Faith FM (Christian radio)
 88.0 MHz Vision Christian Radio – Narrowcast

Balaklava
FM
 88.0 MHz Vision Christian Radio – Narrowcast

Birdwood
FM
 87.6 MHz Vision Christian Radio – Narrowcast

Ceduna
FM
 87.6 MHz Vision Christian Radio – Narrowcast
 106.1 MHz Flow FM

Cleve
FM
 87.8 MHz Vision Christian Radio – Narrowcast
 99.5 MHz 5CC - Australian Radio Network - Relay of 765 kHz

Coober Pedy
 87.6 MHz Vision Christian Radio – Narrowcast
 98.1 MHz Radio TAB – Betting and racing radio
 99.7 MHz Flow FM – Commercial radio
 102.9 MHz CAAMA – Community radio
 104.5 MHz Dusty Radio – Community radio
 106.1 MHz ABC North and West SA – ABC
 107.7 MHz Radio National – ABC

Cowell
FM
 87.8 MHz Vision Christian Radio – Narrowcast

Elliston
FM
 88.0 MHz Vision Christian Radio – Narrowcast

Haslam
FM
 99.0 MHz Vision Christian Radio – Narrowcast

Kadina
FM
 88.0 MHz Vision Christian Radio – Narrowcast
 89.3 MHz Gulf FM

Kapunda
99.5 MHz Flow FM

Kimba
FM
 87.6 MHz Vision Christian Radio – Narrowcast
 106.9 MHz Flow FM

Kingston SE
FM
 87.6 MHz Vision Christian Radio – Narrowcast
 107.3 MHz Flow FM

Laura
FM
 87.6 MHz Vision Christian Radio – Narrowcast

Lameroo
FM
 96.5 MHz Flow FM

Leigh Creek
FM
 97.7 MHz Flow FM

Lock
FM
 88.0 MHz Vision Christian Radio – Narrowcast

Loxton 
FM
 88.0 MHz Vision Christian Radio – Narrowcast
 91.5 MHz 5RM – Australian Radio Network - Relay of 801 kHz
100.7 MHz Riverland Life FM - Community radio (Christian)

Maitland
FM
 90.9 MHz Flow FM

Mannum
FM
 87.6 MHz Vision Christian Radio – Narrowcast

Medlingle Hill
FM
 88.0 MHz Vision Christian Radio – Narrowcast

Meningie
FM
 97.7 MHz Flow FM

Millicent
FM
 107.7 5THE FM - Community radio

Minlaton
FM
 87.6 MHz Vision Christian Radio – Narrowcast

Minnipa
FM
 88.0 MHz Vision Christian Radio – Narrowcast

Moonta
FM
 88.0 MHz Vision Christian Radio – Narrowcast

Mount Gambier
FM
 87.6 MHz Faith FM (Christian radio)
 88.0 MHz Radio TAB (Betting/Racing)
 96.1 MHz SA-FM 96.1 Limestone Coast – Southern Cross Austereo
 100.1 MHz 5GTR FM – Community radio
 102.5 MHz Triple J – ABC
 103.3 MHz Radio National – ABC
 104.1 MHz ABC Classic – ABC
 104.9 MHz Lime FM – Christian Community
 105.7 MHz ABC News – ABC

AM
 963 kHz Triple M Limestone Coast – Southern Cross Austereo
 1476 kHz ABC South East SA – ABC
 1629 kHz SEN SA - Sports Entertainment Network

Murray Bridge
FM
 87.6 MHz RiverCity FM – Narrowcast
96.3 MHz 5MU – Australian Radio Network
98.7 MHz Power FM (Murraylands) – Australian Radio Network

Naracoorte
 87.6 MHz Faith FM (Christian radio)
 88.0 MHz Radio TAB – Racing Radio
 89.7 MHz 5TCB – Community radio
 99.3 MHz Lime FM – Christian radio – Relay of 104.9
100.9 MHz Star FM – Southern Cross Austereo – Relay of 96.1
 1161 kHz ABC South East SA – ABC

Normanville
 87.6 MHz Radio 876 – Country/Easy listening

Orroroo
FM
 88.0 MHz Vision Christian Radio – Narrowcast

Paskeville
FM
 88.0 MHz Vision Christian Radio – Narrowcast

Peterborough
FM
 91.1 MHz 5PBS - Community radio

Pinnaroo
FM
 96.5 MHz Flow FM

Poochera
FM
 87.6 MHz Vision Christian Radio – Narrowcast

Port Augusta
FM
 88.0 MHz Vision Christian Radio – Narrowcast

Port Kenny
FM
 88.0 MHz Vision Christian Radio – Narrowcast

Port Lincoln
FM
 87.6 MHz Wild Country – Country music
 87.8 MHz Vision Christian Radio – Narrowcast
 89.9 MHz Magic FM – Australian Radio Network
 92.3 MHz Triple J – ABC
 93.9 MHz 5CC - Australian Radio Network - Relay of 765 kHz
 107.3 MHz ABC News – ABC

AM
 765 kHz 5CC – Australian Radio Network
 1485 kHz ABC West Coast SA – ABC

Port Pirie
FM
 87.8 MHz Vision Christian Radio – Narrowcast
 88.0 MHz Radio TAB – Horse racing narrowcast
 103.5 MHz Triple J – ABC
 105.1 MHz Trax FM – Community radio
 105.9 MHz Magic FM – Australian Radio Network

AM
 639 kHz ABC North and West SA – ABC
 1044 kHz 5CS – Australian Radio Network
 1629 kHz 5AC 1629am Angel Christian Community Radio – Narrowcast

Renmark
FM
 93.1 MHz – Magic FM – Australian Radio Network
 95.5 MHz - TAB Racing Radio
 101.9 MHz -Triple J – ABC
 105.1 MHz - ABC Classic FM – ABC

AM
 801 kHz - 5RM – Australian Radio Network
 1062 kHz - 1062 ABC Riverland – ABC
 1305 kHz - ABC Radio National – ABC
 1557 kHz - KIX Country – Australian Radio Network

Robe
FM
 107.3 MHz Flow FM

Roxby Downs
 95.5 MHz Radio TAB – Betting and Racing Radio
 96.3 MHz 5AU – Australian Radio Network – Repeater of 1044–1242 Service
 97.9 MHz Flow FM – Remote Commercial Radio
 100.3 MHz 105.9 Magic FM - Australian Radio Network
 101.1 MHz Triple J – ABC
 101.9 MHz Radio National – ABC
 102.7 MHz ABC North and West SA – ABC
 103.5 MHz ABC Classic FM – ABC
 105.5 MHz Rox FM – Community radio

Spencer Gulf
 103.5 MHz Triple J – ABC
 104.3 MHz ABC Classic – ABC
 105.9 MHz Magic FM – Rural Press
 106.7 MHz Radio National – ABC

Smoky Bay
FM
 88.0 MHz Vision Christian Radio – Narrowcast

Streaky Bay
FM
 88.0 MHz Vision Christian Radio – Narrowcast
 99.3 MHz Flow FM

Tailem Bend
FM
 88.0 MHz Vision Christian Radio – Narrowcast

Two Wells
FM
 87.8 MHz Vision Christian Radio – Narrowcast

Virginia
FM
 88.0 MHz Vision Christian Radio – Narrowcast

Victor Harbor
FM
 89.3 MHz Fleurieu FM - Community Radio
 90.1 MHz Happy FM - Community Radio
 97.1 MHz 5MU – Australian Radio Network
 99.7 Mhz Power FM (Victor Harbor) – Australian Radio Network

Waikerie 
FM
 88.0 MHz Vision Christian Radio – Narrowcast
 88.5 MHz Riverland Life FM - Community radio (Christian)
 89.9 MHz 5RM – Australian Radio Network - Relay of 801 kHz

Wallaroo
FM
 87.8 MHz Vision Christian Radio – Narrowcast

Whyalla
FM
 87.6 MHz Vision Christian Radio – Narrowcast
107.7 Triple Y FM – Community radio

Willunga
FM
 91.1 MHz Tribe FM – Community radio

Wirrulla
FM

 88.0 MHz Vision Christian Radio – Narrowcast

Woomera
FM
 88.0 MHz Vision Christian Radio – Narrowcast
 101.7 MHz Flow FM
 103.3 MHz ABC Classic – ABC
 104.1 MHz Triple J – ABC
 104.9 MHz SBS Radio 1 – SBS
 105.7 MHz Radio National – ABC
 107.3 MHz Triple R FM 5RRR - Community radio
AM
 1584 kHz ABC North and West SA – ABC

Yankalilla
FM
 94.7 MHz Fleurieu FM - Community Radio

Yorke Peninsula
FM
 Gulf FM – 89.3 MHz Website – 89.3 Gulf FM – Arthurton
 Flow FM – 90.9 MHz Website – 90.9 Flow FM – Maitland

Western Australia

Perth
AM
585 kHz ABC News – ABC
657 kHz SEN Track – Sports Entertainment Network
720 kHz ABC Radio Perth – Local ABC
810 kHz Radio National – ABC
882 kHz 6PR – Nine Entertainment
990 kHz 990 6RPH Information Radio – Radio Print Handicapped Network
1080 kHz 6IX – Capital Radio Network/Grant Broadcasters
1116 kHz 6MM – Coast Radio
1206 kHz 6TAB – TAB Racing Radio – Racing Narrowcast

FM
87.6 MHz Vision Christian Radio – Narrowcast
87.8 MHz Oz Urban Radio – Urban Music Narrowcast
87.8 MHz Magic FM (Easy 87.8) – Jazz Narrowcast
88.0 MHz Vision Christian Radio – Narrowcast
88.5 MHz VCA FM
89.7 MHz Twin Cities FM – Community radio
91.3 MHz 91.3 SportFM – Community sporting events
91.7 MHz 91.7 WAVE FM - West Coast Radio
92.1 MHz RTRFM – Public radio, music and arts community
92.9 MHz Triple M 92.9 – Southern Cross Austereo
93.7 MHz Nova 93.7 – Nova Entertainment
94.5 MHz Mix 94.5 – Southern Cross Austereo
95.3 MHz World Radio 6EBA-FM – Multicultural community radio
96.1 MHz 96fm – Australian Radio Network
96.9 MHz SBS Radio – Special Broadcasting Service
97.3 MHz 97.3 Coast FM – West Coast Radio
97.7 MHz ABC Classic – National ABC
98.5 MHz 98.5 Sonshine FM – Christian community radio
99.3 MHz Triple J – ABC
100.1 MHz Curtin FM 100.1 – University community radio
100.9 MHz Noongar Radio 100.9FM – Indigenous and Various Music
101.7 MHz Capital 101.7FM - Capital community radio/seniors community
102.5 MHz KCR 102.5FM - Perth Hills community radio - Kalamunda community radio PERTH
103.3 MHz [MAC FM]MACEDONIAN RADIO STATION
107.3 MHz Heritage FM – Community radio
107.9 MHz Radio Fremantle – Community radio

DAB+
Double J
ABC Country
ABC Jazz
ABC Grandstand
SBS Chill
SBS PopAsia
My Perth Digital – Capital Radio Network
Hot Country – Grant Broadcasters
Capital Digital - Capital community radio (Perth) – seniors community
Sonshine Digital
Triple M Classic Rock Digital – Southern Cross Austereo

Albany
AM
 630 kHz ABC South Coast – ABC Local Radio
 783 kHz Triple M – Southern Cross Austereo
 1611 kHz Gold MX – Beaconwood Holdings
 1629 kHz Rete Italia – Italian Broadcasting

FM
 87.6 MHz Vision Christian Radio – Narrowcast
 88.0 MHz Fly FM Albany – Beaconwood Holdings
 92.1 MHz ABC News – ABC
 92.9 MHz Triple J – ABC
 93.7 MHz Vision Christian Radio – Narrowcast
 94.5 MHz ABC Classic – ABC
 95.3 MHz HitFM – Southern Cross Austereo
 96.9 MHz ABC Radio National – ABC
 100.9 MHz Albany Community Radio
 104.9 MHz Racing Radio – Racing and Wagering Western Australia
 106.5 MHz HitFM – Southern Cross Austereo

Augusta
FM
 97.1 MHz 2 Oceans FM (Augusta) - Augusta community radio

Beverley
FM
 87.6 MHz Vision Christian Radio – Narrowcast

Brookton
FM
 88.0 MHz Vision Christian Radio – Narrowcast

Broome
AM
 675 kHz ABC Kimberley – ABC

FM
 87.6 MHz Broome FM – Narrowcast
 87.8 MHz Vision Christian Radio – Narrowcast
 91.7 MHz SBS Radio – Special Broadcasting Service
 93.3 MHz ABC Classic – ABC
 94.9 MHz Triple J – ABC
 99.7 MHz Radio Goolari – Community radio
 101.3 MHz Red FM – Redwave Media
 102.9 MHz The Spirit Network – Redwave Media
 104.5 MHz Racing Radio – Racing and Wagering Western Australia
 106.9 MHz ABC NewsRadio – ABC
 107.7 MHz Radio National – ABC

Bunbury
AM
 621 kHz The Spirit Network – Sports Entertainment Network
 684 kHz ABC South West – ABC
 963 kHz Triple M 6TZ – Southern Cross Austereo
 1017 kHz Vision Christian Radio – Narrowcast
 1116 kHz 6MM
 1152 kHz ABC News
 1224 kHz Radio National – ABC
 1629 kHz Three Angels Broadcasting Network Australia

FM
 93.3 MHz ABC Classic FM – ABC
 94.1 MHz Triple J – ABC
 95.7 MHz HiT FM – Southern Cross Austereo
 96.5 MHz Harvey Community radio
 97.3 MHz Coast FM
 98.5 MHz Tourist Radio
 101.3 MHz Collie Community Radio
 103.7 MHz Bunbury Community Radio

Carnarvon
AM
 666  kHz Classic Hits Website Link: 
 846  kHz ABC Carnarvon
FM
 87.6  MHz Carnarvon FM
 99.7  MHz Hot Hits Website Link: 
 101.3 MHz Triple J (repeat of 99.3fm Perth)
 106.1 MHz ABC News Radio (repeat of 585am Perth)
 107.7 MHz ABC Radio National

Cervantes
FM
 88.0 MHz Vision Christian Radio – Narrowcast
 99.9 MHz Red FM- Redwave Media

Coolgardie
FM
 87.6 MHz Vision Christian Radio – Narrowcast
 97.9 MHz Hot FM Goldfields

Coorow
FM
 88.0 MHz Vision Christian Radio – Narrowcast

Corrigin
FM
 88.0 MHz Vision Christian Radio – Narrowcast

Cranbrook
FM
 88.0 MHz Vision Christian Radio – Narrowcast

Dalwallinu
AM
 531 MHz ABC Radio Dalwallinu
FM
 88.0 MHz Vision Christian Radio – Narrowcast
106.1 MHz Red FM - Redwave Media

Denham
AM
747-Red FM-Redwave Media

FM
 87.6 MHz Vision Christian Radio – Narrowcast
105.3 MHz Hot Hits 105

Denmark
FM
 88.0 MHz Vision Christian Radio – Narrowcast

Derby
FM
 101.1 MHz Vision Christian Radio – Narrowcast

Dongara
AM
 828 kHz ABC Midwest & Wheatbelt – ABC
 1008 kHz Racing Radio- Racing and Wagering Western Australia

FM
 87.6 MHz Vision Christian Radio – Narrowcast
 88.6 MHz Racing Radio – Racing and Wagering Western Australia
 94.9 MHz ABC Classic – ABC
 96.5 MHz Red FM – Redwave Media
 98.1 MHz The Spirit Network – Redwave Media
 98.9 MHz Triple J – ABC
 99.7 MHz ABC Radio National – ABC
 100.5 MHz Midwest Aboriginal Media Association
 101.3 MHz ABC News

Dwellingup
FM
 88.0 MHz Vision Christian Radio – Narrowcast
 97.3 MHz Coast FM

Esperance
FM
 88.0 MHz Vision Christian Radio – Narrowcast
 102.3 MHz Hot FM

Fitzroy Crossing
AM
936 AM Wangki Yupurnanupurru Radio - Community Radio

FM
 88.0 MHz Vision Christian Radio – Narrowcast

Geraldton
AM
 828 kHz ABC Midwest & Wheatbelt – ABC
 1008 kHz Racing Radio- Racing and Wagering Western Australia

FM
 88.6 MHz Racing Radio – Racing and Wagering Western Australia
 94.9 MHz ABC Classic – ABC
 96.5 MHz Red FM – Redwave Media
 98.1 MHz The Spirit Network – Redwave Media
 98.9 MHz Triple J – ABC
 99.7 MHz ABC Radio National – ABC
 100.5 MHz Midwest Aboriginal Media Association
 101.3 MHz ABC News

Gnowangerup
FM
 88.0 MHz Vision Christian Radio – Narrowcast

Green Head
FM
 88.0 MHz Vision Christian Radio – Narrowcast

Halls Creek
FM
 101.3 MHz Vision Christian Radio – Narrowcast

Hyden
FM
 88.0 MHz Vision Christian Radio – Narrowcast

Jurien Bay
FM
 88.0 MHz Vision Christian Radio – Narrowcast
 103.1 MHz Red FM - Redwave Media
 104.7 MHz Spirit Radio Network - Redwave Media

Kalgoorlie
AM
 648 kHz ABC Goldfields-Esperance – ABC
 981 kHz Triple M formerly Radiowest  6KG
 1413 kHz Vision Christian Radio – Narrowcast

FM
 87.6 MHz Vision Christian Radio – Narrowcast
 88.0 MHz Racing Radio – Racing and Wagering Western Australia
 95.5 MHz ABC Classic – ABC
 96.3 MHz CAAMA Radio – Central Australian Aboriginal Media Association
 97.1 MHz ABC Radio National – ABC
 97.9 MHz HOT FM – Southern Cross Austereo
 98.7 MHz Triple J – ABC
 100.3 MHz ABC News – ABC

Katanning
FM
 87.6 MHz Vision Christian Radio – Narrowcast
 94.9 MHz Hot FM - Southern Cross Austereo

Kojonup
FM
 88.0 MHz Vision Christian Radio – Narrowcast

Kondinin
FM
 88.0 MHz Vision Christian Radio – Narrowcast
 92.3 MHz Red FM – Redwave Media

Kulin
FM
 88.0 MHz Vision Christian Radio – Narrowcast

Lake Grace
FM
 88.0 MHz Vision Christian Radio – Narrowcast

Lancelin
FM
 88.0 MHz Vision Christian Radio – Narrowcast
 102.3 MHz Red FM Lancelin
 103.9 MHz Spirit Lancelin

Leeman
FM
 88.0 MHz Vision Christian Radio – Narrowcast
 103.7 MHz Spirit Radio Network-Redwave Media

Leonora
FM
 98.5 MHz Vision Christian Radio – Narrowcast

Margaret River
AM
 1611 kHz Vision Christian Radio – Narrowcast

FM
 100.3 MHz Hot FM - Southern Cross Austereo

Marble Bar
FM
 88.0 MHz Vision Christian Radio – Narrowcast

Mandurah

FM
91.7 MHz 91.7 THE WAVE FM – West Coast Radio
 97.3 MHz 97.3 Coast FM – West Coast Radio

Meekatharra
FM
 87.6 MHz Vision Christian Radio – Narrowcast
 98.3 MHz Meeka FM - Community Radio
 101.5 MHz Triple M - Southern Cross
 103.1 MHz Hit FM - Southern Cross Austereo

Merredin
FM
 88.0 MHz Vision Christian Radio – Narrowcast
 105.1 MHz Hit FM - Southern Cross Austereo
AM
 1098 kHz Triple M - Southern Cross

Moora
FM
 87.6 MHz Vision Christian Radio – Narrowcast
 90.9 MHz Red FM- Redwave Media

Mount Barker
FM
 93.7 MHz Vision Christian Radio – Narrowcast
 95.3 MHz HOT FM
106.5 MHz HOT FM

Mount Magnet
FM
 88.0 MHz Vision Christian Radio – Narrowcast
102.5 MHz Red FM-Redwave Media

Mukinbudin
FM
 88.0 MHz Vision Christian Radio – Narrowcast

Mullewa
FM
 88.0 MHz Vision Christian Radio – Narrowcast

Narembeen
FM
 88.0 MHz Vision Christian Radio – Narrowcast

Narrogin
AM
 558 kHz ABC Great Southern – ABC Local Radio
 918 kHz RadioWest – Southern Cross Austereo
 1296 kHz Radio National – ABC
 1422–1611 kHz 6GS – Narrowcast

FM
 87.6 MHz Vision Christian Radio – Narrowcast
 92.5 MHz ABC Classic – ABC
 96.3 MHz ABC News – ABC
 98.1 MHz Triple J – ABC
 100.5 MHz Hot FM – Southern Cross Austereo

Newdegate
FM
 88.0 MHz Vision Christian Radio – Narrowcast

Newman
FM
 87.6 MHz Vision Christian Radio – Narrowcast
 90.5 MHz Red FM - Redwave Media
 92.9 MHz 6NEW - Newman Community Radio

Norseman
FM
 88.0 MHz Vision Christian Radio – Narrowcast

Northam
AM
 864 kHz Triple M formely RadioWest – Southern Cross Austereo Callsign 6AM
 1215 kHz ABC Central Wheatbelt – ABC

FM
 87.6 MHz Vision Christian Radio – Narrowcast
 96.5 MHz Hot FM – Southern Cross Austereo
 98.1 MHz Triple J – ABC
 98.9 MHz ABC Classic – ABC
 99.7 MHz ABC News – ABC
 101.3 MHz York FM

Northampton
FM
 87.6 MHz Vision Christian Radio – Narrowcast
 96.5 MHz Red FM - Redwave Media
 98.1 MHz Spirit Radio Network - Redwave Media

Onslow
FM
 100.3 MHz Hot Hits 99.7 relay
 101.9 MHz Vision Christian Radio – Narrowcast

Paraburdoo
FM
 98.1 MHz Vision Christian Radio – Narrowcast

Pingelly
FM
 88.0 MHz Vision Christian Radio – Narrowcast

Quairading
FM
 88.0 MHz Vision Christian Radio – Narrowcast

Ravensthorpe
FM
 88.0 MHz Vision Christian Radio – Narrowcast

Roebourne
FM
 97.7 MHz Vision Christian Radio – Narrowcast

Southern Cross
FM
 88.0 MHz Vision Christian Radio – Narrowcast

Tambellup
FM
 88.0 MHz Vision Christian Radio – Narrowcast

Tom Price
FM
 100.9 MHz JJJ
 102.5 MHz ABC RR
 105.7 MHz Spirit FM
 106.5 MHz Gumala Radio
 104.1 MHz Vision Christian Radio – Narrowcast

Toodyay
FM
 88.0 MHz Vision Christian Radio – Narrowcast
 105.3 MHz Toodyay Community Radio – Local community radio

Trayning
FM
 88.0 MHz Vision Christian Radio – Narrowcast

Useless Loop
FM
100.3 MHz ABC Local Radio
102.7 MHz Triple J

Wagin
AM
 558 kHz ABC Local Radio Great Southern – ABC
 1422 kHz Radio Great Southern - Radio Great Southern
 1611 kHz Easy Listening - Radio Great Southern
FM
 87.6 MHz Vision Christian Radio – Narrowcast

Walpole
FM
 88.0 MHz Vision Christian Radio – Narrowcast

Wickepin
FM
 88.0 MHz Vision Christian Radio – Narrowcast

Wiluna
FM
 87.6 MHz Vision Christian Radio – Narrowcast

Wongan Hills
FM
 88.0 MHz Vision Christian Radio – Narrowcast

Wyndham
FM
 88.0 MHz Vision Christian Radio – Narrowcast

York
FM
 87.6 MHz Vision Christian Radio – Narrowcast

Tasmania

Hobart
AM
585 kHz Radio National – ABC
747 kHz ABC News – ABC
864 kHz 7RPH – Radio Print Handicapped Network
936 kHz ABC Radio Hobart – ABC
1080 kHz TOTE Sport Radio – Racing radio
1620 kHz NTC Radio Australia

FM
88.0 MHz Vision Christian Radio – Narrowcast
92.9 MHz Triple J – ABC
93.9 MHz ABC Classic – ABC
96.1 MHz Hobart FM (7THE) – Community radio (also translated on 92.1 MHz for areas south of Hobart)
99.3 MHz Edge Radio – Community radio
100.9 MHz Hit 100.9 – Southern Cross Austereo
101.7 MHz 7HO FM – Australian Radio Network
105.7 MHz SBS Radio 1 – Multilingual
106.5 MHz Ultra106five – Christian radio
107.3 MHz Triple M Hobart – Southern Cross Austereo

DAB+
936 ABC Hobart
ABC Classic FM
Double J
ABC Jazz
ABC Country
ABC KIDS listen
ABC Grandstand
ABC News Radio
ABC Radio National
SBS Chill
SBS Radio 1
SBS Radio 2
SBS Radio 3
SBS Radio 4
SBS Arabic24
SBS PopAsia
SBS PopDesi
Triple J
Triple J Unearthed
107.3 Triple M
Hit 100.9
7HO FM
KIX Country

Bagdad
FM
 88.0 MHz Vision Christian Radio – Narrowcast

Bicheno
FM
 88.0 MHz Vision Christian Radio - Narrowcast
 89.7 MHz ABC Northern Tasmania - ABC Local Radio
 91.3 MHz Radio National - ABC
 98.5 MHz Star FM - Community Radio

Bridgewater
FM
 88.0 MHz Vision Christian Radio – Narrowcast

Burnie
FM
 87.6 MHz Vision Christian Radio – Narrowcast
 90.5 MHz ABC News – ABC
 97.7 MHz TOTE Sport Radio – Racing Radio
 100.9 MHz 7BU - Australian Radio Network
 101.7 MHz Sea FM – Australian Radio Network
 102.5 MHz ABC Northern Tasmania – ABC
 106.1 MHz Coast FM Tasmania – Community radio

Campbell Town
FM
 88.0 MHz Vision Christian Radio – Narrowcast

Devonport
FM

 98.9 MHz 7AD - Australian Radio Network
 100.5 MHz ABC Northern Tasmania – ABC
 101.3 MHz TOTE Sport Radio – Racing radio
 104.7 MHz Coast FM Tasmania – Community radio
 107.7 MHz Sea FM – Australian Radio Network

Fingal
FM
 88.0 MHz Vision Christian Radio – Narrowcast

Geeveston
FM
 88.0 MHz Vision Christian Radio – Narrowcast

Huon Valley
 98.5 MHz Huon FM Website – Community radio – (Geeveston) 95.3 MHz
 87.8 MHz Pulse FM Kingborough and Huon  - Youth Narrowcast Radio

Huonville
FM
 88.0 MHz Vision Christian Radio – Narrowcast

Kettering
FM
 88.0 MHz Vision Christian Radio – Narrowcast

Kingston
FM
 88.0 MHz Vision Christian Radio – Narrowcast

Latrobe
FM
 87.6 MHz Vision Christian Radio – Narrowcast

Lauderdale
FM
 87.6 MHz Vision Christian Radio – Narrowcast

Launceston
FM
 89.3 MHz LAFM (7LA) – Australian Radio Network
 90.1 MHz Chilli FM (7EX) – Australian Radio Network
 90.9 MHz Triple J – ABC
 91.7 MHz ABC Northern Tasmania – ABC
 92.5 MHz ABC News – ABC
 93.3 MHz ABC Classic – ABC
 94.1 MHz Radio National – ABC
 103.7 MHz & 96.5 MHz City Park Radio – Community radio
 104.5 MHz SBS Radio 1 – SBS
 105.3 MHz Way FM – Christian radio
 106.9 MHz 7RPH – Relay of 864 from Hobart

AM
 1008 kHz TOTE Sport Radio – Racing Radio

Longford
FM
 87.6 MHz Vision Christian Radio – Narrowcast

Midway Point
FM
 87.6 MHz Vision Christian Radio – Narrowcast

New Norfolk
FM
 87.6 MHz Faith FM – Christian radio
 88.0 MHz Vision Christian Radio – Narrowcast

Orford
FM
 87.6 MHz Vision Christian Radio – Narrowcast

Penguin
FM
 87.6 MHz Vision Christian Radio – Narrowcast
 106.1 MHz Coast FM Tasmania – Community radio

Perth
FM
 87.8 MHz Vision Christian Radio – Narrowcast

Queenstown
FM
 88.0 MHz Vision Christian Radio – Narrowcast
 88.9 MHz Triple J – ABC
 90.5 MHz ABC Northern Tasmania – ABC
 92.1 MHz 7XS – Australian Radio Network
 95.3 MHz KIX Country - Australian Radio Network

AM
 630 kHz Radio National – ABC

Richmond
FM
 88.0 MHz Vision Christian Radio – Narrowcast

Rosebery
 102.7 MHz Triple J – ABC
 106.3 MHz ABC Northern Tasmania – ABC
 107.1 MHz 7XS – Relay of 837 kHz from Queenstown – Australian Radio Network
 107.9 MHz Radio National – ABC

Scottsdale
FM
 88.0 MHz Vision Christian Radio – Narrowcast
 95.7 MHz 7SD - Australian Radio Network
 99.7 MHz Sea FM – Australian Radio Network

AM
 540 kHz 7SD – Australian Radio Network

Shearwater
FM
 87.6 MHz Vision Christian Radio – Narrowcast

Sheffield
FM
 87.6 MHz Vision Christian Radio – Narrowcast

Smithton
 94.5 MHz 7BU – Relay of 558 kHz from Burnie – Australian Radio Network
 88.9 MHz Coast FM Tasmania – Community radio
 105.5 MHz Triple J – ABC

Somerset
FM
 87.6 MHz Vision Christian Radio – Narrowcast

Sorell
FM
 88.0 MHz Vision Christian Radio – Narrowcast

Strahan
 88.0 MHz Vision Christian Radio – Narrowcast
 101.9 MHz Triple J – ABC
 105.1 MHz 7XS – Relay of 837 kHz from Queenstown
 105.9 MHz Radio National – ABC
 107.5 MHz ABC Northern Tasmania – ABC Local Radio

St Helens
FM
 88.0 MHz Vision Christian Radio – Narrowcast
 90.5 MHz Chilli FM - Australian Radio Network
 92.1 MHz 7SD - Australian Radio Network
 93.7 MHz Star FM - Community Radio
 96.1 MHz Radio National - ABC

AM
 1584 kHz ABC Northern Tasmania - ABC Local Radio

St Leonards
FM
 88.0 MHz Vision Christian Radio – Narrowcast

St Marys
FM
 88.0 MHz Vision Christian Radio – Narrowcast
 100.3 MHz Star FM - Community Radio
 101.1 MHz Radio National - ABC
 102.7 MHz ABC Northern Tasmania - ABC Local Radio
 103.5 MHz Chilli FM - Australian Radio Network
 105.1 MHz 7SD - Australian Radio Network

Triabunna
FM
 88.0 MHz Vision Christian Radio – Narrowcast
 88.9 MHz Radio National - ABC
 90.5 MHz ABC Radio Hobart - ABC Local Radio

Tunbridge
FM
 88.0 MHz Vision Christian Radio – Narrowcast

Ulverstone
FM
 87.6 MHz Vision Christian Radio – Narrowcast
 106.1 MHz Coast FM Tasmania – Community radio

Wynyard
FM
 106.1 MHz Coast FM Tasmania – Community radio

Zeehan
FM
 88.0 MHz Vision Christian Radio – Narrowcast

Northern Territory

Darwin
FM
 91.5 MHz Darwin FM – Narrowcast
 92.3 MHz Top Country – Narrowcast
 94.5 MHz Radio Larrakia – Community radio
 97.7 MHz Rhema FM 97.7 – Christian radio
 100.1 MHz Hot 100 – Australian Radio Network
 100.9 MHz SBS Radio 1 – SBS
 102.5 MHz ABC News – ABC
 103.3 MHz Triple J – ABC
 104.1 MHz 104.1 Territory FM – Community radio
 104.9 MHz Mix 104.9 – Australian Radio Network
 105.7 MHz ABC Radio Darwin – ABC
 107.3 MHz ABC Classic – ABC

AM
 657 kHz Radio National – ABC
 1242 kHz Radio TAB (Betting/Racing) – Relay Radio TAB – Brisbane
 1530 kHz Yolngu Radio – Aboriginal community radio
 1611 kHz Rete Italia – Italian Radio

Alice Springs
FM
 88.0 MHz Vision Christian Radio – Narrowcast
 94.9 MHz Triple J – ABC
 95.9 MHz Radio TAB (Betting/Racing) – Relay Radio TAB – Brisbane
 96.9 MHz Sun FM – Sun FM
 97.9 MHz ABC Classic – ABC
 98.7 MHz Tourist Gold FM
 99.7 MHz Radio National – ABC
 100.5 MHz CAAMA – Aboriginal community radio
 102.1 MHz 8CCC – Community radio
 104.1 MHz ABC News

AM
 783 kHz ABC Alice Springs – ABC
 900 kHz 8HA

Alyangula
FM
 88.0 MHz Vision Christian Radio – Narrowcast

Borroloola
FM
 88.0 MHz Vision Christian Radio – Narrowcast

Elcho Island
FM
 88.0 MHz Vision Christian Radio – Narrowcast

Gapuwiyak
FM
 88.0 MHz Vision Christian Radio – Narrowcast

Katherine
FM
 87.6 MHz Vision Christian Radio – Narrowcast
 88.0 MHz KatCountry88 - Narrowcast
 94.9 MHz ABC Classic
 99.7 MHz Triple J - 8JJJ
 101.3 MHz 8KTR - Community radio
 103.7 MHz Radio TAB
 104.5 MHz CAAMA
 105.3 MHz ABC News Radio - 8PNNN
 106.1 MHz ABC Katherine – ABC Local Radio
 106.9 MHz Mix FM

AM
 639 kHz ABC Radio National

Lajamanu
FM
 88.0 MHz Vision Christian Radio – Narrowcast

Milingimbi Island
FM
 88.0 MHz Vision Christian Radio – Narrowcast

Nhulunbuy
FM
 88.0 MHz Vision Christian Radio – Narrowcast

Numbulwar
FM
 88.0 MHz Vision Christian Radio – Narrowcast

Ramingining
FM
 88.0 MHz Vision Christian Radio – Narrowcast

Tennant Creek
FM
 102.1 MHz 8CCC – Community radio
 104.5 MHz Vision Christian Radio – Narrowcast

Yirrkala
FM
 88.0 MHz Vision Christian Radio – Narrowcast

Yulara
FM
 88.0 MHz Vision Christian Radio – Narrowcast
 95.7 MHz Triple J – ABC
 97.3 MHz Radio TAB (Betting/Racing) – Relay Radio TAB – Brisbane
 98.1 MHz Radio National – ABC
 98.9 MHz ABC Classic – ABC
 99.7 MHz ABC Local Radio – Australian Broadcasting Corporation
100.5 MHz 8HA – Relay of 900 kHz
102.1 MHz CAAMA – Aboriginal community radio
105.3 MHz Tourist Gold FM

Networks
Ace Radio
Australian Broadcasting Corporation
ABC Local Radio
ABC NewsRadio
Radio National
ABC Classic
Triple J
Australian Radio Network
KIIS Network
Pure Gold Network
Broadcast Operations Group
Capital Radio Network
Sports Talk
Faith FM
Nova Entertainment
Nova FM
smoothfm
Grant Broadcasters
Nine Entertainment
Southern Cross Austereo
Hit Network
Triple M
RadioWest
Radio Print Handicapped Network
RawFM Radio Network
Special Broadcasting Service
SBS Radio 1
SBS Radio 2
SBS National
Sky Racing
Sports Entertainment Network
 Super Network
Three Angels Broadcasting Network
Victorian Racing Committee
Vision Christian Radio

See also
List of Australian television channels
List of ABC radio stations
List of Australian AM radio stations
Timeline of Australian radio
History of broadcasting
History of broadcasting in Australia
Community radio
Christian radio

References

External links
Radio Heritage Foundation
Digital Radio Plus
Search ACMA's database
ACMA → List of transmitters with a licence to broadcast → Radio and TV broadcasting stations
Radio and Television Broadcasting Stations (Internet Edition 2022-01)
Australian Radio Stations
Australian Radio Online
Radio Garden

Australian
Radio stations